= Christiaan Lindemans =

Dutch double agent (1912–1946)

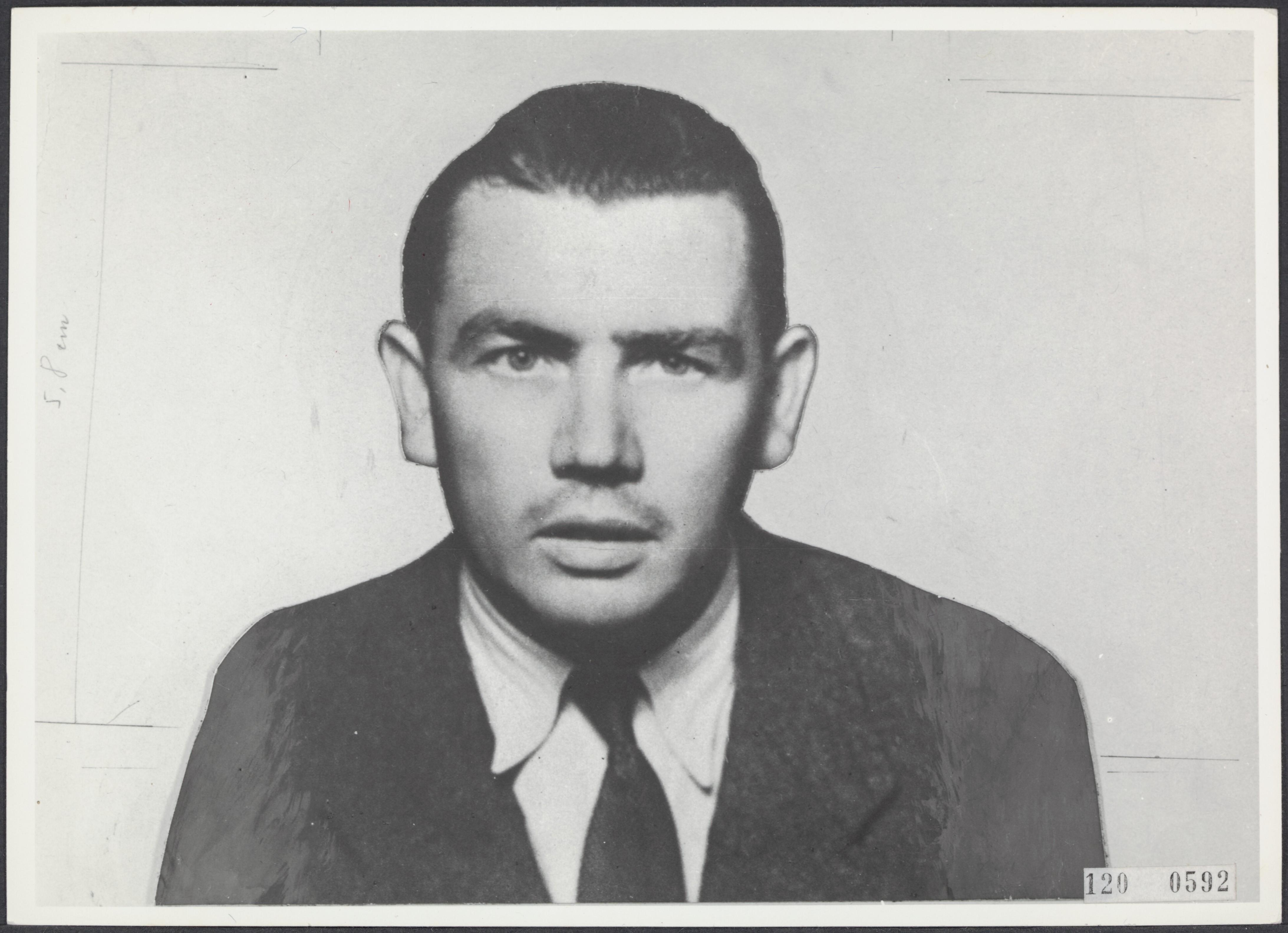
- Born: 24 October 1912; Rotterdam, The Netherlands
- Died: 18 July 1946 (aged 33); Scheveningen, The Netherlands
- Cause of death: Suicide (drug overdose)
- Other name: Freddi Desmet
- Occupations: Motor engineer, double agent
- Spouse: Gilberte Yvonne Letuppe (m. 1941)
- Children: 2

Christiaan Antonius Lindemans (24 October 1912 – 18 July 1946) was a Dutch double agent during the Second World War who worked for the Dutch resistance, but defected to the Nazis. Otherwise known as Freddi Desmet, a Belgian army officer and SOE agent with security clearance at the Dutch Military Intelligence Division of the SOE (MID/SOE). He was known by the soubriquets King Kong (for his height and build) in the Netherlands, and in Belgium and France as "le Tueur" ("The Killer") as he was reportedly ready to shoot at the slightest provocation. There is speculation that Lindemans was a member of Colonel Claude Dansey's Z organisation.

He has been blamed for betraying Operation Market Garden and as a result helped the Germans win the battle of Arnhem in 1944. The loss of this battle prolonged the war for six months and allowed the Red Army to enter Berlin first.

Krist, as he was called by comrades, had worked for the Allies, being personally responsible for the death of at least twenty-seven Germans during the guerrilla war in the outskirts of Antwerp.

== Biography ==
He was the fourth son of Joseph Hendrik Lindemans and Christina Antonia van Uden. Before the outbreak of the Second World War, Lindemans worked alongside his elder brother Jan as a mechanic at his father's garage in Rotterdam. In the summer of 1936, he was injured in a motorcycle accident where he sustained a cracked skull and injuries to his left arm and leg which left him walking with a lumbering, simian-like, gait (described by some as a slight limp and a deformed hand). Tall and heavily built (6 ft 3 and 260 lbs), he was nicknamed "King Kong" (a name given to him by his rowing trainer). He spoke French and German well and some English.

Intelligence services, Resistance work, Escape lines

By his own account, Lindemans started work as an informant for the British Secret Service in the spring of 1940, relaying shipping movements to London. In August of that year, he found work as lorry driver on the Lille to Paris route, transporting petrol for the Luftwaffe. While living in Lille, and through his girlfriend (who later became his wife), he became involved with the French Resistance sometime in 1940. Around September 1942, he established his own escape line in Abbeville, where he was arrested two months later after being denounced by a woman living in Paris, an acquaintance named Colette. He was imprisoned by the Germans for five months and was the only member of his organisation to be detained.

By 1943, his popularity as one of the leaders of the Dutch resistance was its highest. He had begun collecting jewels and other valuables from rich women to provide fighting funds for an underground "escape route" through occupied Belgium and the Netherlands into Spain and Portugal.

Lindemans had regular contact with resistance movements, some with communist tendencies such as the Raad van Verzet or Council of Resistance (which engaged in both communications sabotage and the protection of onderduikers, i.e. people in hiding)), the CS VI group of Amsterdam (a clandestine sabotage and intelligence organisation, one of whose members was Dutch Captain Kas de Graaf, (Note: In the autumn of 1943, Lindemans helped de Graaf escape from the Netherlands en route to London (Jan. 1944). The de Graff-Lindemans connection came under scrutiny during Lindemans' incarceration at Camp 020. Lindemans was one of the highest-ranking members of CS VI.)) the Trouw (Fidelity), the Het Parool (The Spoken Word), the Dutch-Paris escape line run by John Henry Weidner and evasion networks within the jurisdiction of MI9. Lindemans was a member of one of the 12 recognised units of the Belgian underground army called fr:Les Affranchis (The Liberated, ranked 12, founded by Camille Tromme), allowing him to possess a machine gun and a revolver.

Arrest of Lindemans brother and pregnant wife

Sometime in February 1944, his younger brother Hendrik ("Henk") was arrested in Rotterdam by the Sicherheitspolizei and held captive at The Hague, to await execution for helping English people escape from the Netherlands. This was followed on 24 February by the arrest of his wife, a French cabaret singer who worked for the French Resistance named Gilberte Letuppe (nicknamed Gilou Lelup) at the Hotel Montholon in the 9th arrondissement of Paris. She had previously worked as an ambulance driver for the French Red Cross and was three months pregnant with her second child at the time of her arrest.

The arrest was made by two members of the Gestapo, assisted by four heavily armed German soldiers. They searched her bag and her room and found three ID cards, Kommandantur signatures, pass and German employment permits, all stolen the previous day. In addition to the items discovered, three revolvers and a box of ammunition, to be handed over to a French resistance movement in Bordeaux (Lindemans was there at the time of his wife's arrest) were confiscated. Lindemans' wife, a member of Swane's organisation, operated under the aliases of "Anna Van Vredenburgh" and "Yvonne". Among others that were arrested was Victor "Vic" Swane, the head of an escape network.

Letuppe was taken prisoner and interrogated for 11 hours that day. She was beaten with such force in the face that she fell from her chair, but she refused to speak. She was then taken to Fresnes Prison, south of Paris, where she was jailed, manacled by hand and feet, and was given no food or water for four days. She was questioned violently a couple of times (twenty-four), beaten in the face on every occasion. Due to her refusal to speak, she spent the next six months in solitary confinement.

She was registered, at the beginning of August, to be the last woman admitted to Fort de Romainville, a stop before deportation. Her file, numbered 6 862, described her as having been born on 15 September 1922 and being nine months pregnant ("9 Monat schwanger") when she was among the prisoners aboard the last convoy (Note: Letuppe was to be deported to Ravensbrück concentration camp, branded with the number 57584.) (I.264, 15 August 1944) of deportees from Paris (quai des bestiaux, gare de Pantin) to Germany and, like some of her fellow inmates who were considered unfit for transportation, she was evacuated from the Fort of Romainville on 17 August to a local hospice in Saint-Denis where she gave birth on 25 August 1944 to her second child, a daughter named Christianne. Letuppe's release may have been ordered by Abwehr Colonel Oscar Reile. He supposedly left Paris on 18 August. The fort of Romainville was under the control of the German military authorities.

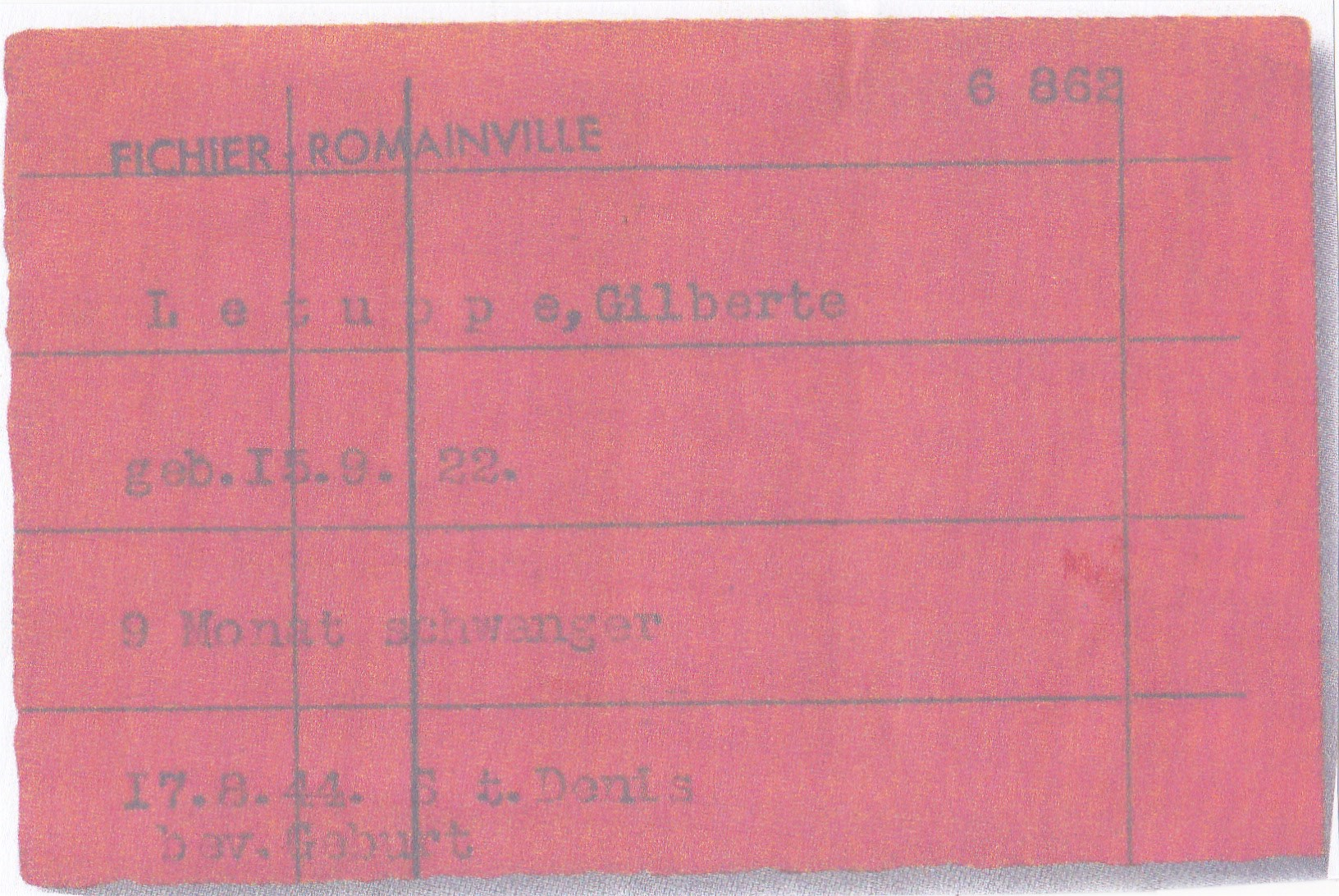
Gilberte Letuppe's record card, fort de Romainville, circa August 1944, the German military abbreviation, bev which is short for Bevollmächtigter and typed next to Geburt (birth), can be translated into English by authorized agent or Plenipotentiary

Her testimony was later written down by the Allied Information Service (AIS)-SHAEF (Note: Her husband last name was misspelled as "Sindemans.) and used as evidence in the Nuremberg trials.

Abwehr deal: Release of Lindemans' brother and wife

By March 1944, Christiaan was able to initiate contact (Note: There are different versions of the same story, Lindemans and Verloop.) with the Abwehr (Note: Abwehr III West section Northern France, Belgium and the Netherlands was renamed FAK 307 and headed by Giskes (March 1944), FAK (Front-Aufklärungs-Kommando or Front Intelligence Units) 307 was under the authority of Colonel Oscar Reile.) operatives in Brussels. Due to his inability to pay 10,000 Florins requested by the first intermediary agent in exchange for their freedom, Lindemans agreed to meet Dr Gerhard. Gerhard, sometimes called "Dr German" (pseudonym for Hermann Giskes), had run the successful Operation North Pole and could speak perfect English without a trace of a German accent. In a villa outside Brussels Lindemans agreed to become a double agent (Note: Lindemans was known to German Intelligence Service as either Christiaan Brand or by his real name. The name Brand was given to him in early 1944 by a Dutch resistance group. One of Lindemans' sisters-in-law was named Brand.) on condition that his wife and brother were released. Giskes claimed that he performed his part of the bargain. Henk Lindemans was released in due course and went as a voluntary worker to Germany where he had some acquaintances.

From here on, Christiaan Lindemans (Abwehr codenamed CC) was instructed to renew contact with resistance agents and transmit back to Major Hermann Giskes (Note: After the war, Giskes was recruited by the CIA sponsored intelligence organization, the Gehlen Organization.) information about the resistance movement in the occupied Netherlands, France and Belgium. In return, he received large sums of money. During his time as an informant for the German military intelligence service, he was closely shadowed by an Abwehr agent. Lindemans' early denunciations created a Domino effect resulting in the arrest of 267 members of the Dutch and Belgian Resistance. In the wake of the D-Day's landings, Lindemans was said to have "visited" the British sector of the Normandy beachhead and succeeded in getting himself recruited by IS 9 (Intelligence School 9 a.k.a. Nine Eyes) Western Europe Area, an Anglo-American secret agency which worked under MI9, by the end of September 1944 (Note: 23 September, date of the first meeting between Lindemans and Prince Bernhard at Chateau Wittouck. Half of Chateau Wittouck was occupied by Prince Bernhard's staff and the other half by the First Canadian Army.), he was a member of exiled Dutch Prince Bernhard's Staff (Note: 20 September, date of Lindemans' first visit to Prince Bernahrd's HQ.) and was appointed liaison officer (with temporary rank of Captain in the Netherlands Forces of the Interior) between Dutch resistance and a British Intelligence unit commanded by a Canadian officer. (Note: Lindemans was assigned to a junior Canadian officer by Lieutenant-Colonel Maurice Louis De Rome, OBE, ED, of the Royal 22nd Regiment and Special Forces Detachments (SFD) attached to the First Canadian Army. In 1945, De Rome was appointed special military adviser to the Netherlands Army and to his H.R.H. Prince Bernhard, in July 1948, he was promoted to chief of staff, Quebec Army Command with HQ in Montreal. De Rome alongside RN officer Philip Johns (Within Two Cloaks) who was then head of SOE's branch in the Low Countries accompanied Intelligence Corps officer Peter Baker to his first meeting with Lindemans.)

== September 1944 ==
On 3 September 1944, Giskes left Brussels (en route to his next assignment in Bonn, Giskes' FAK 307 was now attached to Army Group B) and instructed Lindemans to stay in Belgium and make contact with Anglo-Canadian intelligence. He was to offer himself as an agent, the mission was to find out what plans Canadian Intelligence (Note: Lindemans was to find out the status of the Belgian resistance in the forthcoming of an Allied attack and Allied plans for infiltrating agents behind German lines.) had made for the Netherlands and as soon as possible cross the lines with that information, in that case he was to use a secret code to get past German sentries. Lindemans, involved in the liberation of the city of Brussels, alongside three Belgian police officers, attacked German forces who were still holding out in the North railway station district. Lindemans killed two German soldiers and wounded two others.

On 4 September 1944, British intelligence officer, Captain Peter Baker of IS 9 of the D group (Western Europe Area), an expert in sabotage and hand-to-hand combat and assigned to SHAEF G-2 division (intelligence), arrived in Brussels (office at the Hotel Metropole where he set up a W/T station) on his way to newly liberated Antwerp in search of a Dutchman who would be able to go through the lines and contact Allied airmen hiding in the southern part of the Netherlands (Allied pilots were to stay put as the Allied armies were preparing to move toward Eindhoven).

An Armée secrète's operative named Urbain Renniers (Note: Renniers codenamed Reaumur, was a Belgian Army engineering officer that became one the leaders of the Belgian secret Army in Antwerp. He provided Lindemans with a written statement for bravery exhibited during the liberation of Antwerp. Renniers played a major role in ensuring that the Port of Antwerp was kept intact upon arrival of the Allies.) recommended Lindemans for the job, before sending him out, Baker made a few enquiries, he then went to the 21st Army Group's (Note: IS 9 (WEA) was attached to the intelligence staff of Montgomery's 21 Army.) headquarters which in turn contacted Prince Bernhard's staff to check Lindemans's credentials. Bernhard pressured Captain Peter Baker that Lindemans could be trusted and should be used as the Dutch liaison to cross the lines with information for the local resistance about the upcoming operation Market Garden. Accordingly, special priority clearance was granted and an IS 9 pass in the name of Christiaan Brand was issued, despite Baker's misgivings.

Lindemans, operating under the alias of "De Vries" which was given to him by Baker to protect his identity, had now joined The Buccaneers, Baker's private army, the Jolly Roger was the unit Battle standard. The De Vries alias was also used by another Abwehr agent, Antonie Damen. Lindemans was required to be Baker's chauffeur. The Baker mission (It is conceivable that it was part of an elaborate deception operation) beginning on 12–13 September from the Belgium town of Diest.

On the night of 14 September, (Note: There is some confusion about the exact date and area of Lindemans crossing into enemy lines, Langley mentioned the event in his wartime memoir he co-wrote with British historian M. R. D. Foot as taking place four days before Operation Market-Garden started, setting the occurrence a day earlier, on 13 September before midnight and the crossing point being described as near Eindhoven and not Beringen as it is officially recorded. Langley states it was Lindemans' call and other sources say the order came from First Canadian Army's HQ, Lindemans' assignment under Canadian arrangement was to gather the resistance to link-up for the imminent Operation Market-Garden mission. Langley claimed that before being given green light, Pinto had warned him that Lindemans was a possible German spy.) Captain Baker ordered Lindemans and a Belgian named Lucien de Ness to Hechtel-Eksel near Beringen (location of Capt Baker HQ, the British intended to drive onto Eindhoven with 300 tanks from the bridgehead near Beringen). For most of his journey, Lindemans, wearing full British battle dress, was escorted by a patrol of 14 British soldiers under the authority of a Major Ross (pseudonym for a British officer). Lindemans and de Ness crossed the frontline near Valkenswaard through a hail of shells. de Ness was seriously wounded and was taken to a German field hospital, where he died shortly after. For Lindemans, he had a rendezvous with German headquarters in the Netherlands.

Lindemans first met with German Luftwaffe general Kurt Student in Vught (Note: Student denied that he ever met Lindemans. On 17 September, Luftwaffe's Flack (Fliegerabwehrkanone, stands for anti-aircraft guns) had reportedly shot down a glider (British or American) near the First Parachute Army's command post, among its cargo, details of Operation Market-Garden were discovered by a Feldwebel and brought immediately to the attention of Student. However, this gave details only of the 101st Airborne Division's operation.) and then escorted to Driebergen by Giskes' right-hand man, Abwehr agent Richard Christmann (1905–1989) who had been detached from FAK 307 to FAT 365 in the upcoming meeting with Lindemans. The latter was driven back to the region of Eindhoven on 16 September by agent Christmann (codenamed Arnaud). (Note: Holder of the War Merit Cross, first class, Christmann was instrumental in the success of Operation North Pole, by October 1944, he was in charge of protecting the V-2 Bases. He established contact in May 1945 with the British intelligence service and provided intelligence to the SAS Belgian Regt of Operation Fabian (mention in Theodore Bachenheimer article, see Notes section). Alike Colonel Reile and Major Giskes, Christmann were recruited into the Gehlen Organisation)

Alongside his BBO assignment, Lindemans had received a Dutch BI (bureau of information, The Dutch exile government's intelligence service and MI-6 counterpart) order by Baker, that once in Eindhoven he was to deliver personally to four high-ranking members of a Dutch resistance organisation, all employed by The Philips Company also known as Eindhoven Philips (Note: From 1934 to 1944 at least, the Philips laboratories had an extensive atomic research program, Lindemans was acquainted with Philips' representatives in Brussels and Paris.) the following assignment that they should hold back information on the development of V-2 rocket and a cyclotron (Note: Commissioned by the Reich Postal Office for its laboratory in Miersdorf near Zeuthen. The RPM was headed by Wilhelm Ohnesorge.) until the Allies reached them unless they considered it to be a strategic imperative. In that case, they were to hand their intelligence to Lindemans on his way back through the lines and to prevent the Germans from committing acts of sabotage against Philips' factories.

Possibly part of the Melanie Mission, (Note: The Melanie Mission reached Eindhoven on 21 September 1944. Baker had written in his memoirs that he was to meet with some men (an unidentified party) in Eindhoven.) a joint operation between the Office of Strategic Services and the BI, the Melanie Mission was to collect military, economic and industrial intelligence.

On Saturday 16 September, he went to the safe house of resistance police officer Inspector Kooy, whose address had been given to Lindemans via Baker by Dutch intelligence liaison officers. Kooy started to suspect Lindemans, had him searched, and a copy of the Deutsche Zeitung in den Niederlanden and a pass signed by Major Ernest Kiesewetter, head of FAT (Note: Front-Aufklärungs-Truppe) 365 in Driebergen (Giskes' subordinate and successor) was discovered in his pocket, Lindemans answered that he had picked up the newspaper on the road and the document bearing Kiesewetter's signature was a forgery. Unconvinced by Lindemans' explanation, Kooy had him locked up in a coal cellar near the police station .

Lindemans was released on Tuesday, 19 September, one day after the Allies entered Eindhoven (Note: Baker expressed admiration for Lindeman's courageous and devoted conduct that he displayed after his release.) by Baker who was absolutely furious that one of his best agents had been detained. Kooy produced the items that he had discovered on Lindemans, only for Baker to say that the newspaper meant nothing and the pass was a fake. On 23 September, Lindemans was debriefed and cleared of any suspicion by Captain de Graff (A coded telegram was sent to the BI HQ in London noting that Lindemans was all right) and Captain de Jong who had recently arrived from England and who was also serving on Prince Bernhard's Staff.

On duty with the SOE and in company of two British officers, Lindemans paid a visit to French resistance fighter, Charles Buisine on 17 October. Buisine, a veteran of the Battle of France, had been recruited into the SOE in 1940 by Lindemans with the immediate rank of Lieutenant, he was head of an intelligence and escape network codenamed Sector 6-North-F (stretching from the neighbouring of Orchies to Lille) with HQ in Beuvry. Buisine codenamed agent 28/24, who was working under the authority of Belgian Officer Desmet, was unaware of his commanding officer's true identity.

Waiting to be alone with Buisine, Lindemans said:

In a choked voice, it is here Lindemans says, I chose to say farewell to Desmet who now ceases to exist and the same for the SOE Lieutenant, agent 28/24 of sector 6, in a short time, Buisine, you will known my name.

In the following days, Buisine learnt, to his own disbelief, that Freddi Desmet, SOE Captain of the Belgian army with an impeccable track record and Christiaan Lindemans, one of the leaders of the Communist group CS VI of Amsterdam who was being held prisoner by the British Military Police on suspicion of treason, were the same.

=== Tactical advantage ===
Since the war, various authors have speculated that Lindemans' information led Field Marshal Model (The Tafelberg Hotel was Model's Tactical HQ in Oosterbeek in the neighbouring of Arnhem and the Hartenstein Hotel was used as the German Officers' Mess. Model moved to Oosterbeek on 11 September.) to reposition the II SS Panzer Corps (commanded by General Bittrich whose headquarters were in Doetinchem 15 miles east of Arnhem.) under the cover of darkness to positions overlooking likely Airborne targets, mainly bridgeheads, near Arnhem and for the troops. They were camping in the nearby forests waiting for Allied airdrop to begin.

According to Lindemans, the Allies wanted to attack Eindhoven. More specifically, Lindemans' information stated that an Allied attack would be north of Eindhoven and would consist of Airborne troops eventually being backstopped by Allied armour.

Lindemans' information (report dated 22 August) was incomplete but enough to let the German High Command (Oberkommando der Wehrmacht) pinpoint enemy targets, most likely the bridges at Grave, Nijmegen and Arnhem.

The last-mentioned was brought forward in Lindeman's report. In early September, Field Marshall Model who had the task of defending a line running from the North Sea to the Swiss border (500 miles), had ordered the 9th SS Panzer Division Hohenstaufen and the 10th SS Panzer Division Frundsberg to Arnhem for refitting and upgrading under the direction of Bittrich who would set up his command post in the area in preparation for the upcoming Allied invasion of Germany in reaction to the V-2 campaign.

Lindemans' second report (dated 15 September) made into two summaries (general information and prospective aerial landings), enabled the Germans to counter-attack and send further reinforcements made up of auxiliary units from the Arnhem and Nijmegen areas.

The limited availability of German jet planes, most of the Me 262 were grounded due to the lack of fuel, made it impossible to fully use Lindemans' intelligence on the position of Eisenhower's HQ and the whereabouts of Allied battle tanks.

Allied aircraft reconnaissance, used on 11 and 16 September but not on the 15th due to bad weather, noted nothing critical being detected.

== Capture and death ==
On 26 October 1944, Lindemans was denounced as a German spy by fellow Abwehr agent Cornelis Johannes Antonius Verloop (Note: Born in 1909 in The Hague, Verloop joined the French Foreign Legion in 1935, he deserted to join the Abwehr as an active intelligence operative, he was involved in the mock arrest of British traitor Harold Cole (December 1941). He was the one who put Lindemans in touch with Giskes, Verloop crossed into the liberated section of North Brabant on Abwehr instructions to discover the whereabouts of Abwehr agent Damen who had not returned from a previous mission.) nicknamed Satan Face (Abwehr codenamed "Nelis"), a recipient of the German Cross in Gold. Verloop, who at that time was in Allied hands, claimed (Note: Verloop was questioned by Dutch counterintelligence officer Oreste Pinto, to prove that he could be trusted. Verloop named members of Pinto's staff including British officer Captain Baker. The intelligence had been passed to him by Kiesewetter.) that Lindemans had betrayed Operation Market Garden to intelligence officer Kiesewetter on Friday, 15 September at the Abwehr station in Driebergen. "King Kong" showed no resistance to his arrest by British security officer Alfred Vernon Sainsbury of the Special Forces Detachment on the afternoon of 28 October 1944 at Prince Bernhard's headquarters at Château de La Fougeraie also known as Château Wittouck in Uccle, outside of Brussels.

After five days in St-Gilles-Prison, Brussels, Lindemans was transferred to Camp 020 (A maximum-security prison), and placed under the command of Lieutenant colonel R.W.G. Stephens nicknamed Tin Eye. Lindemans' personal effects were seized but these provided no evidence of his betrayal.

Following an intense two-week interrogation by MI5 agents, Lindemans had several epileptic seizures and consequently, made a full and detailed confession (Note: Lindemans' files and confession went missing prior to his death. The confession (24 pages) appears to have been compiled from four reports written down at different times (6 December 1944).) and contrary to initial findings, compelled by Camp 020 officers that they were unable to report what information (Note: An ISOS (Intelligence Services Oliver Strachey) decrypt of an Abwehr signal dated from end of August (22 August) reveals that it contained Lindemans' report to Giskes on a meeting (21 August) between British officers and Dutch resistance representatives. Information about possible landings of airborne troops in the Meuse area were disclosed, it is unclear in what capacity Lindemans intended this secret conference and if he used his real name or the Christiaan Brand alias. In Giskes' book, London Calling North Pole, the event is cited as taking place on 25 August, the message was transmitted to Abwehr Departement III West (Paris station) who had moved to Sainte-Menehould. However Giskes acknowledged that an attempt made to check the validity of Lindemans' report (22 August) proved unsuccessful.) Lindemans had transmitted to the enemy, Colonel Stevens recommended that Lindemans should receive the death sentence. Lindemans' questioning at Camp 020 had revealed that he had general knowledge on some of Nazi Germany's top-secret weapons including the V-2 program and the existence of an atomic bomb that could burn and destroy everything within a radius of 500 yards, that large amounts of gold were stored in an unknown location in Brussels. He also disclosed that Giskes was a personal friend of Hitler. Lindemans was also suspected of helping German spies get back into enemy lines during October.

He returned to Dutch custody (7 December 1944) where he was jailed in Breda Prison up to March 1945 and in Scheveningen until summer 1946 for treachery during the war. (Note: Pinto was ordered back to SHAEF's HQ to be congratulated on his catch by a Very Important Person with a soft American accent.)

Oreste Pinto (Note: Pinto's distrust of Lindemans began with their first encounter which occurred in early September 1944 at an Allied detention camp near Antwerp where Pinto was the security officer. Lindemans had two female detainees removed from the camp before they had been cleared for release.) did visit Lindemans at least once. The very muscular and keen boxer was now a shadow of his former self, (Note: Lindemans was reported to be suffering from the debilitating effects of partial paralysis, his medical condition featured in Pinto's book, Spycatcher.) the two men looked at each other, Lindemans asked, "Is there no mercy?", Pinto did not reply. Lindemans allegedly committed suicide by swallowing 80 aspirin (Note: Alternatively for meds and cause of death, Luminal, an anti-epileptic drug, he killed himself by hitting his head with a club and next taking arsenic.) in a psychiatric ward (Note: Psychiatric wing of the Scheveningen prison also known as the Orange Hotel.) before his case could be heard.

=== Prison, rumours and escape ===
In the summer of 1946, a Dutch newspaper published an article on a prison break which occurred at Scheveningen Prison. Three men who were being held at the camp for political delinquency escaped, with one of the escapees being Lindemans (a previous escape attempt by Lindemans from the same place having been thwarted), he may have been allowed to escape to South America after a body-swap.

=== Russian syndicate ===
I received your letter but cannot understand it. You must know that after many tortures by the Germans, she (Lindemans' wife) is very afraid to speak to British or Dutch agents. I have had my chance to escape, but I was waiting for you, because we worked in the same job. I liked the British better than the Dutch therefore I will work. My wife Gilou likes to work with me and nobody else. I suppose that you are afraid that I am working with the wrong organisation, but that is not true, otherwise I would not have told you all these things. If you think you can play with me, then you will lose. I am in your hands now, so do what you like.
– Lindemans' reply, Scheveningen Prison, to security officer, Lieutenant Van Dijk acting under the orders of D.G. Baber, RAF security officer, Ypenburg, the Netherlands, c. April–May 1946

In April 1946, Lindemans' wife visited the Soviet Embassy in Rotterdam, at least on three occasions. The British intelligence service took the matter seriously and intervened with the help of one of their agents inside Scheveningen Prison to get through to Lindemans, in exchange for his wife's safety, he agreed to share information on a Russian organisation that had ties with senior members of France, Germany and the Netherlands Armed forces and civilian administrations. This organisation is said to be all over the Netherlands and actively trying to absorb all Dutchmen who served in the SS during the war, had taken into custody German engineers who had worked on the German atomic project and exfiltrated them to the Soviet Union, the same group had now spread to Persia, possibly threatening British interests. The British intelligence service cross-checked Lindemans' report and found it to be very accurate.

The same mysterious organisation might have been involved in Verloop breaking out of Scheveningen Prison (1946). According to his British personal file, classified 'Red', Verloop was regarded by the British intelligence service as one of the most dangerous German spies to have worked in the Netherlands. He was last seen in 1949, reappearing decades later, although Lindemans was believed to have known where Verloop was hiding. Verloop's name was on the official list of German agents kept by Admiral Wilhelm Canaris in his office in Berlin.

During the 1980s, Verloop was interviewed by French historian, Michel Rousseau about two SOE networks in the north of France, the Garrow-Pat O'Leary network and the Farmer network of Michael Trotobas. The article was printed in the French quarterly publication Revue d'histoire de la Deuxième Guerre mondiale et des conflits contemporains in 1984. He was also interviewed by American journalist, Brendan M. Murphy, for his projected book on British spy turned traitor Harold Cole, published in 1987.

In January 1944, posing as patriots, Verloop and fellow Abwehr agent, Antonie Damen, raised suspicion in the mind of one member of the Belgian resistance movement, Mrs Lambot of 15, rue d'Alliance, Brussels. Lambot lodged that Verloop and Damen, were suspected to be working for the Russian intelligence service. Damen's capture by Allied forces resulted in Verloop's capture as well.

=== Body exhumed ===
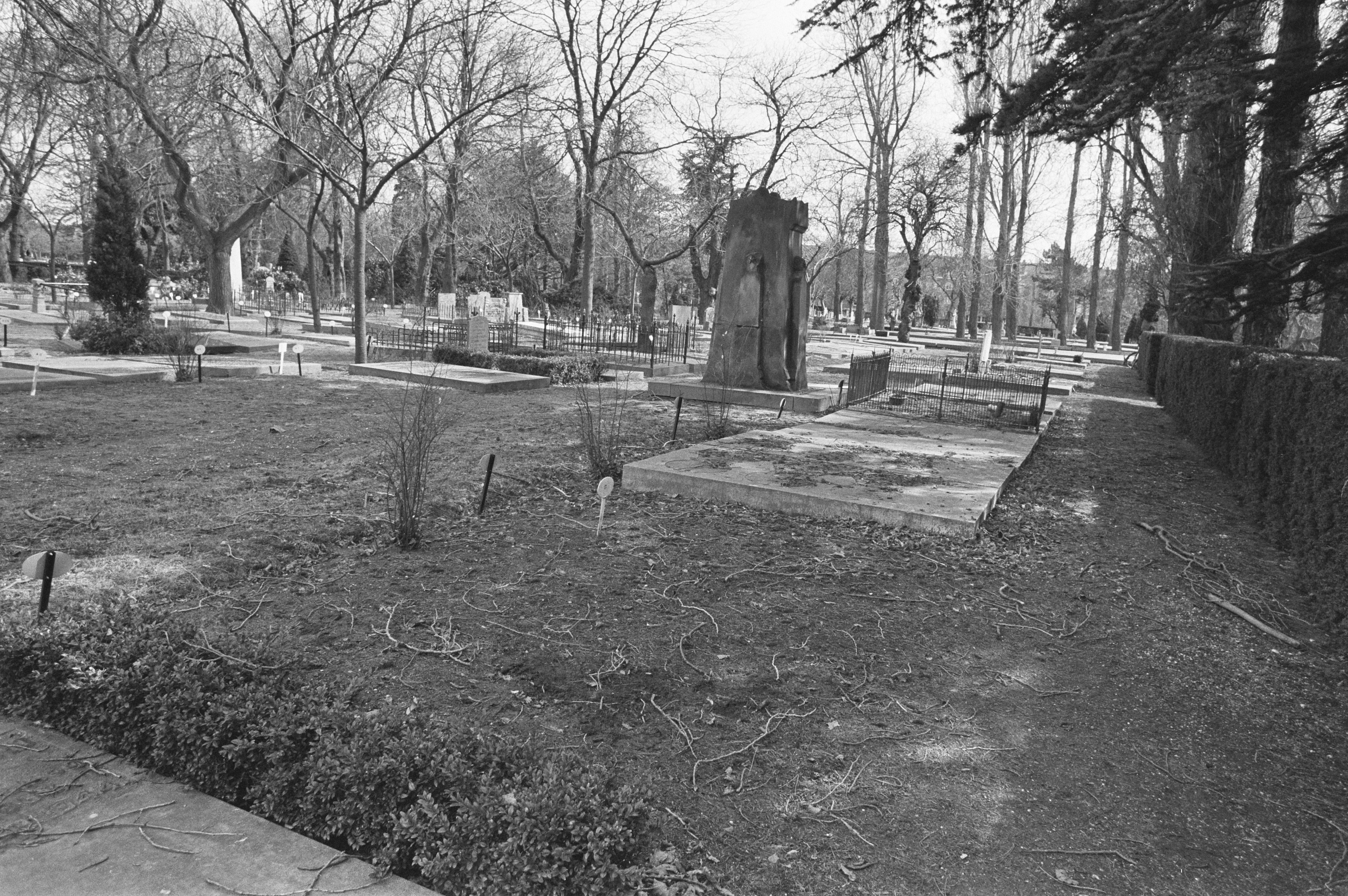
Lindemans' resting place, Rotterdam, picture dated, 25 March 1986.

On Tuesday, 17 June 1986, (Note: Ordered by Rotterdam mayor Bram Peper on a request by resistance veteran, Haarlem city councillor Belinda Thone.) Dutch pathologist Martin Voortman positively identified a skeleton exhumed as that of Christiaan Lindemans, according to Voortman, the skeleton had an irregularly healed break in its left ankle, consistent with Lindemans' medical records. The body (Note: According to Dutch General Practitioner Dr Hans.C Moolenburgh, Lindemans' autopsy revealed unexplained high levels of Arsenic.) was recovered (Note: Lindemans surviving brother and two daughters witnessed the exhumation.) at dawn the same day from Rotterdam Crooswijk cemetery from a coffin sandwiched between those of Lindemans' parents.

Hendrik (Henk) Lindemans who witnessed the exhumation of his brother's body, stated that he was convinced that the remains were those of his brother.

In 1997, Lindemans' suicide note surfaced and had provided satisfactory evidence that Lindemans took his own life.

== Film by Richard Attenborough ==
A close-up of a Beware, the Walls Have Ears poster can be seen in Richard Attenborough's 1977 film adaptation of Operation Market Garden, A Bridge Too Far.

== The Lindemans files ==
The NARA retains some files on Lindemans and the documents are located among the Office of the Secretary of Defense (RG 330) records. The Lindemans files are still security classified as late as 2015.
