= The Telephone (opera) =

Opera by Gian Carlo Menotti

- Comic opera by Gian Carlo Menotti
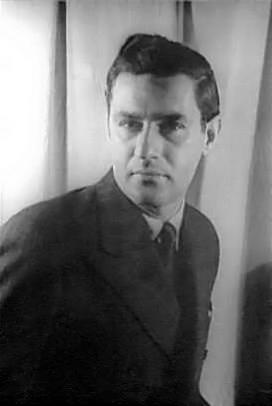
- The composer in 1944
- Librettist: Menotti
- Language: English
- Premiere: February 18, 1947; Heckscher Theater, New York City

The Telephone, or L'Amour à trois is an English-language comic opera in one act by Gian Carlo Menotti, both words and music. It was written for production by the Ballet Society and was first presented on a double bill with Menotti's The Medium at the Heckscher Theater, New York City, February 18–20, 1947. The Broadway production took place on May 1, 1947, at the Ethel Barrymore Theatre. The Metropolitan Opera Company presented it once, at the Lewisohn Stadium, on July 31, 1965.

== Roles ==
Role	Voice type	Premiere Cast, February 18, 1947 (Conductor: Jascha Zayde)
Lucy England	coloratura soprano	Marilyn Cotlow
Ben Upthegrove	baritone	Frank Rogier

== Synopsis ==
Ben, bearing a gift, comes to visit Lucy at her apartment; he wants to propose to her before he leaves on a trip. Despite his attempts to get her attention for sufficient time to ask his question, Lucy is occupied with interminable conversations on the telephone. Between her calls, when Lucy leaves the room, Ben even takes the risk of trying to cut the telephone cord, though his attempt is unsuccessful. Not wanting to miss his train, Ben leaves without asking Lucy for her hand in marriage. But Ben makes one last attempt: He calls Lucy from a telephone booth outside on the street and makes his proposal. She consents, and the two join in a romantic duet over the phone line, at the end of which Lucy makes sure that Ben remembers her phone number.

== Recordings ==
Film and video

- In 1968 a film of the opera was made for SFB / ORF, in German. Anja Silja and Eberhard Wächter portrayed the young couple. It was conducted by Milo Chamberlain, and the production was directed by Otto Schenk
- In 2006 a DVD was licensed by Decca Music Group and released by Video Artists International, with Carole Farley and Russell Smythe in the roles and José Serebrier conducting the Scottish Chamber Orchestra. This DVD also includes a performance of Francis Poulenc's La voix humaine, whose story also contains a telephone conversation.
- In 2020, Scottish Opera and the Parea Series each released a film of the opera; both were set in the 21st century with smartphones as the titular telephone, with the Parea Series film set specifically during the COVID-19 pandemic.

== Discography ==
- The Medium, The Telephone, Marilyn Cotlow, Frank Rogier, conducted by Emanuel Balaban, Columbia Masterworks OL 4172.
- The Medium, The Telephone, Elizabeth Hertzberg, Lorenzo Grante, Orchestra Filarmonica Italiana, Flavio Emilio Scogna, Brilliant Classics 95361, 2018.
