= Operation Pegasus =

Military evacuation after Battle of Arnhem (1944) during WW2

Coordinates: 51.9767°N 5.7252°E

- Part of the Battle of Arnhem
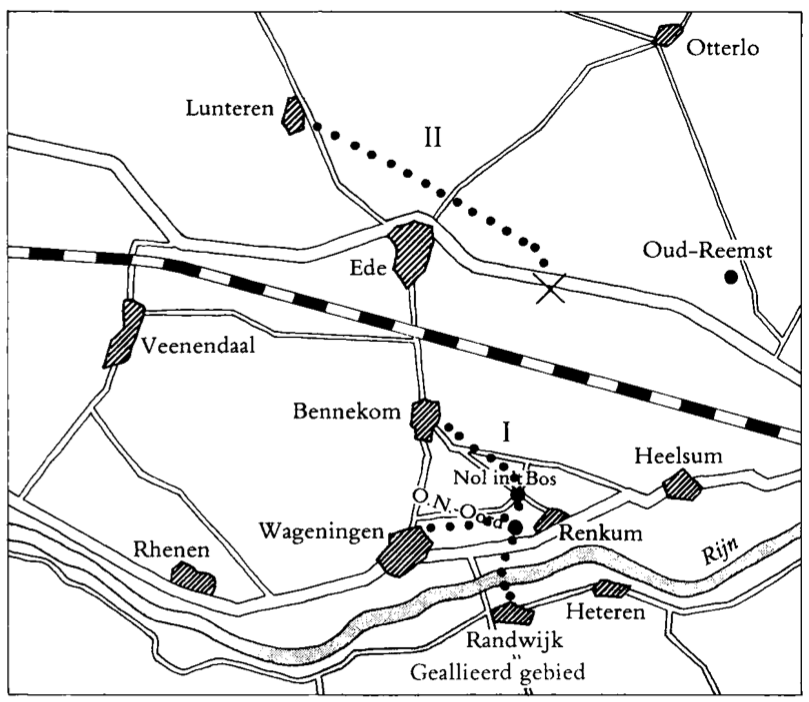
- Route of escaping soldiers in Pegasus I and II
- Type: Evacuation
- Location: Lower Rhine at Renkum, the Netherlands
- Planned by: Lt Colonel David Dobie; Major Digby Tatham-Warter, Dutch resistance
- Objective: Safely evacuate survivors of the British 1st Airborne Division
- Date: Night of 22/23 October 1944; 2100 – 0200
- Executed by: Royal Canadian Engineers; 506 PIR, 101st Airborne Division; Dutch resistance
- Outcome: 138 men evacuated
- Casualties: 1 man (missing)

Operation Pegasus was a military operation carried out on the Lower Rhine near the village of Renkum, close to Arnhem in the Netherlands. Overnight on 22–23 October 1944, Allied military forces, Britain's MI9 intelligence organisation, and the Dutch Resistance evacuated 138 men, mostly soldiers trapped in German-occupied territory who had been in hiding since the Battle of Arnhem a month earlier.

The fighting north of the Rhine in September had forced the 1st British Airborne division to withdraw, leaving several thousand men behind. Several hundred of these were able to evade capture and go into hiding with the assistance of the Dutch Resistance. Initially, the men hoped to be able to wait for the British 2nd Army to resume its advance and thus rescue them, but when it became clear that the Allies would not cross the Rhine that year, the men decided to escape back to Allied territory. The first escape operation (Pegasus I) was a success, but a second operation (Pegasus II) was compromised and failed. Despite this, the Resistance continued to help the evaders and many more men were able to escape in small groups over the winter.

== Background ==
=== Battle of Arnhem ===
In September 1944, the Western Allies launched Operation Market Garden, an attempt by the British 2nd Army to bypass the Siegfried Line and advance into the Ruhr, Germany's industrial heartland. The operation required the First Allied Airborne Army to seize several bridges over rivers and canals in the Netherlands, allowing ground forces to advance and cross the Lower Rhine at Arnhem. The 1st British Airborne Division dropped onto Arnhem on 17 September. They encountered far greater resistance than had been expected and only a small force were able to reach Arnhem road bridge. XXX Corps ground advance became delayed and without reinforcement this small force under Lt Colonel John Frost was overwhelmed. The rest of the division became trapped in a small perimeter in Oosterbeek and were withdrawn on the night of 25/26 September in Operation Berlin. More than 10,400 British and Polish paratroopers fought in the battle of Arnhem. In Operation Berlin, between 2,400 and 2,500 men escaped to the south bank, leaving some 7,900 men behind. Of these almost 1,500 were killed and more than 6,000 were captured by the Germans. At the end of the battle, 500 paratroopers were still in hiding in villages north of the Nederrijn (lower Rhine River).

== Organising the escape ==
MI9, the British intelligence agency formed to help soldiers and airmen stranded behind enemy lines evade German capture, parachuted agent Dick Kragt into the Netherlands in June 1943. Prior to the Battle of Arnhem in September 1944, Kragt, his deputy Joop Piller, and their escape organisation helped more than 100 allied airmen shot down over the occupied Netherlands to escape to Brussels, Belgium from where the Comet Escape Line guided the downed airmen to Spain and hence to safety in England. Thus, by the time of the Battle of Arnhem, MI9 had experienced agents in the Netherlands to help stranded allied military personnel.

Airey Neave of MI9 arrived in Nijmegen in early October 1944 to assist in the rescue of the British soldiers located near Arnhem and hiding from the Germans. Major Hugh Fraser of the Special Air Service (SAS) joined him as his second-in-command. Nijmegen (captured by the allies in Operation Market Garden) was 16 kilometres (10 mi) south of Arnhem with two large river crossings, the Waal and the Lower Rhine separating the two cities. Neave and Fraser found a way to communicate by telephone from Nijmegen to the Dutch Resistance in Ede where many of the British soldiers were hiding and received nightly reports about casualties and evaders which greatly assisted in the planning of Pegasus. The telephone link was crucial in planning the operation.

In a decision he later acknowledged as poor, Neave sent Captain Peter Baker into German-controlled territory to contact the Dutch Resistance, but Baker, who "fancied himself as a secret agent" disobeyed orders and was captured on 16 October, disrupting plans for the evacuation of the soldiers. Baker survived as a prisoner of war, but the Ebbens family who sheltered him were executed. The Dutch civilians who hid and gave shelter and food to the stranded soldiers ran a greater risk than did the soldiers. Captured soldiers were sent to prisoner of war camps; Dutch civilians who helped the soldiers were often executed. The Germans were aware that a large number of British soldiers were hiding near Arnhem and were actively searching for them.

Inside German controlled territory, Major Digby Tatham-Warter had escaped a German hospital as early as 21 September and, having lain low for a week, came into contact with the Dutch Resistance in the town of Ede. In early October he was joined by Brigadier Gerald Lathbury and soon a 'Brigade HQ in hiding' was set up. Tatham-Warter made contact with Gilbert Sadi Kirschen of the Belgian SAS who arranged supply drops of weapons, uniforms and supplies for the growing number of British hiding in the area.

Piet Kruijff, head of the local Resistance, had been organising the evaders into safe houses in Ede. Soon there were over 80 men in the town and it was becoming so congested that he began housing men in Oud-Reemst as well. By the time of the evacuation an additional 40 men were there. At first it was hoped that the Allied offensive would be quickly resumed thus liberating the men. Tatham-Warter even made plans to carry out operations against the Germans when the 2nd Army began crossing the Rhine. However, in October Kirschen informed the Resistance that there were no plans to attack north of the Lower Rhine in the near future. As the presence of so many Allied evaders would place a great strain on the Resistance and expose the civilians hiding them to great risk, it was decided to evacuate the men as soon as possible.

The 'HQ in hiding' near Arnhem was in contact with MI9 and 2nd Army in Nijmegen. Lt Colonel David Dobie (commander of 1st Battalion) was rowed across the Rhine by a young Dutchman on the night of 16 October and reached Allied lines. Dobie contacted the XXX Corps and the 101st Airborne Division, who approved the proposed evacuation. Dobie was appointed to lead the evacuation with Neave and Fraser as his intelligence officers. They contacted Tatham-Warter by telephone and drew up a plan they hoped would allow all of the men in hiding to escape.

Dobie selected a location on the river near Renkum to make the crossing of the Rhine (codenamed Digby). The Rhine was 150 to 200 metres (490 to 660 ft) wide. A route to the river from the north were decided upon, and it was arranged that the men would be met on the north bank by Royal Canadian Engineers and British Royal Engineers of XXX Corps escorted by men of the 506 PIR, 101st Airborne Division. To help guide the evaders the crossing point would be marked by tracer fire from a Bofors gun. The American forces sent patrols north of the river and tracer fire over the river for several nights to disguise the actual purpose of the operation when it came. The date was set for the night of 23–24 October.

== Pegasus I ==
On 20 October the Germans ordered residents of villages near Arnhem to leave their homes by the 22nd. Deciding to take advantage of the confusion this would cause, the date for the operation was brought forward to the night of 22–23 October.

The Pegasus operation required the combined efforts of MI9, the Dutch Resistance, and British and American soldiers. The Dutch Resistance was asked to collect the stranded soldiers from their hiding places and take them to a location near the village of Renkum, 5 kilometres (3 mi) west of Arnhem on the German-controlled north side of the lower Rhine River. From the south bank of the river, controlled by the allies, the Royal Engineers of the British Army crossed the river in rowing boats accompanied by American paratroopers who were there to provide combat support, if needed. Neave and Fraser of MI9 set up a command centre in a farmhouse near Randwijk to greet the evaders on the southern bank of the Rhine after they had successfully crossed.

The German presence in this area was very heavy after the Arnhem fighting and the men assembled in a location only 500 metres (1,600 ft) from German machine gun nests. By dark 139 men had assembled. They were mainly from the 1st Airborne Division, but there were also a US 82nd Airborne Division trooper, a number of aircrew, some Dutch civilians, and some Russians wishing to join the Allies. The men were organised into platoons and at 9 pm began moving south towards the river. Tatham-Warter recorded that the Germans were almost certainly aware of their presence, but perhaps unsure of their numbers and wary of American patrols, they kept some distance. There was one contact with a patrol and a brief exchange of fire, but no one was hurt.

At midnight the group reached the riverbank and moved to the crossing point indicated by the Bofors tracer fire. Once there they flashed a V for Victory signal with their torches, but there was an anxious wait of twenty minutes for the boats. In fact, on the south bank, Dobie, the engineers, and a patrol of E Company, 506 PIR observed the signal and immediately launched their boats, but the British were some 500 to 800 metres (1,600 to 2,600 ft) upriver of the crossing point. Upon reaching the north bank E Company established a small perimeter while men headed east to locate the evaders. The men quickly moved downstream and in the next 90 minutes all of them were evacuated, with the exception of a Russian who was caught and arrested by the Germans. The Germans opened fire sporadically and some mortar rounds fell near the crossing, but the fire was inaccurate. Once on the other side, the escapees were led to a farmhouse for refreshments, before being driven to Nijmegen where Dobie had arranged a party and champagne. The men were later flown back to the UK, rejoining the men who had escaped in Operation Berlin.

== Pegasus II ==
Operation Pegasus II
- Part of the Battle of Arnhem
- Type: Evacuation
- Location: Lower Rhine at Oosterbeek, the Netherlands
- Objective: Safely withdraw escapees north of the Lower Rhine
- Date: Night of 18 November 1944
- Outcome: Failure

The success of the first evacuation prompted the Allies to organise Operation Pegasus II to evacuate additional soldiers trapped near Arnhem. Unfortunately the security of this operation was compromised early, when a reporter impersonated an intelligence officer and interviewed several escapees from the first operation. The subsequent news story alerted the Germans who strengthened their patrols along the river.

Major Hugh Maguire (of HQ, 1st Airborne Division) was put in charge of the second escape. The operation largely replicated the original, but was due to take place 4 kilometres (2.5 mi) further east on the evening of 18 November. A party of between 130 and 160 men would attempt to cross the river on this occasion, although this number included a much higher proportion of civilians, aircrew, and other non-infantry who were unused to this sort of operation. Because of the distance from Ede to the crossing point and the need to skirt a German 'no man's zone', the main party's march to the river was approximately 23 kilometres (14 mi), compared to the 5 kilometres (3 mi) of Pegasus I, and would take two days to make. The main party became fragmented on the second night and while attempting to make a short cut, one party under Major John Coke of the King's Own Scottish Borderers stumbled into a German patrol. Several men were killed in the resulting firefight – perhaps more than twenty – and the evaders were forced to scatter. No one was able to cross that night, although seven men crossed during the next two days. The Germans searched the area intensively with patrols and spotter planes, enabling them to capture more of the evaders, and most of the Resistance's Dutch guides were killed or captured.

== Later escapes ==
Colonel Graeme Warrack and Captain Alexander Lipmann Kessel had been on the abortive Pegasus II, but were able to escape capture. Like many of the remaining evaders, they continued to hide in German-occupied territory for some months. In February 1945, they joined Brigadier John Hackett, who by now had recovered from his injuries sustained at Arnhem. Kessel had saved Hackett's life during the battle and even performed minor operations during their time in hiding. They eventually escaped across the Waal at Groot-Ammers, 40 kilometres (25 mi) west of Arnhem, on a route later used by another 37 men, including Gilbert Kirschen.

== Notable escapees ==
Although many men had failed to return after the Battle of Arnhem, many were able to escape in Operation Pegasus or with the aid of the Resistance over the winter. They included senior ranks:

- Brigadier Gerald Lathbury, CO 1st Parachute Brigade (Operation Pegasus).
- Brigadier John Hackett, CO 4th Parachute Brigade (February 1945).
- Colonel Graeme Warrack, Senior medical officer, 1 Airborne Division (February 1945).
- Lieutenant Colonel David Dobie, CO 1 Battalion, Parachute Regiment (in advance of Operation Pegasus).
- Lieutenant Colonel Martin Herford, 163 RAMC (October 1944).
- Major Allison Digby Tatham-Warter, OC A Company, 2 Battalion, Parachute Regiment (Operation Pegasus).
- Major Anthony Deane-Drummond, 2IC Divisional Signals (Operation Pegasus).
- Major Tony Hibbert, Brigade Major 1st Parachute Brigade (Operation Pegasus).
- Captain Alexander Lipmann Kessel, 16th (Parachute) Field Ambulance (February 1945).

== In popular culture ==
Operation Pegasus was depicted in the fifth episode of the 2001 HBO miniseries Band of Brothers.

== Bibliography ==
- Atkinson, Rick (2013). The Guns at Last Light. New York: Henry Holt and Co. ISBN 978-0-80-506290-8.
- Foot, M.R.D.; Langley, J.M. (1980). MI9 Escape and Evasion 1939–1945. Boston: Little, Brown and Company. ISBN 978-0-31-628840-8.
- Fry, Helen (2020). MI9. New Haven: Yale University Press. ISBN 978-0-30-023320-9.
- Neave, Airey (1970). The Escape Room. New York: Doubleday & Company. OCLC 88924. First published in England in 1969 as Saturday at M.I.9.
- Van der Zee, Henri (1998). The Hunger Winter: Occupied Holland 1944–1945. University of Nebraska Press. ISBN 0-8032-9618-5.
- Waddy, John (2010). Tour of the Arnhem Battlefield. Barnsley: Pen and Swords Military. ISBN 978-0-85-052571-7.
