= Jennifer Wilson (soprano) =

American opera singer (born 1966)

Jennifer Wilson (born 1966, Fairfax, Virginia, USA) is an American soprano known especially for her Wagnerian opera roles. She is the daughter of Newton Wilson (son of the late Frontier Airlines co-founder Raymond Wilson) and Katherine Still. The daughter, granddaughter and niece of professional singers, instrumentalists and music educators, Wilson grew up steeped in music from opera and oratorio to rock 'n' roll and bluegrass. She began tap dance lessons at age 3, ballet at 8, piano at 10, and solo classical singing at 12. Wilson attended Cornell University for several years, eventually departing on a leave of absence which she filled with advanced training in acting, languages, and vocal studies with former Metropolitan Opera coloratura soprano Marilyn Cotlow. During this time, Wilson supported herself as a news bureau assistant and wire editor for Radio Free Europe/Radio Liberty. The consolidation of US international broadcast services in 1995 caused Wilson to lose her position with RFE/RL, forcing her to find other employment. At this point she took up singing full-time, though her breakthrough to the elusive ranks of international soloist was still several years away.

== Professional opera career ==
Wilson made her professional debut relatively late at the age of 36 in the title role of Puccini's Turandot with the Connecticut Opera in 2002. Prior to this she had spent much of her career in the chorus of opera houses such as Washington Opera or as an understudy. Following this debut, she went on to take a number of major roles in the US although initially often appearing at short notice when the scheduled artist was unable to appear. Such roles included:

- Turandot (Puccini), Houston Grand Opera, 2003/2004 season
- Brünnhilde (Wagner): Lyric Opera of Chicago, 2004/2005 season.

It was not until the 2004/2005 season, when, as an understudy, she took over from Jane Eaglen, due to illness, as Brünnhilde in Wagner's Götterdämmerung at the Lyric Opera of Chicago, that domestic and international success was to begin. Anne Midgette notes that Wilson's acclaimed performance in this role was made more remarkable by the fact that she had sung Brünnhilde in Die Walküre (in rehearsal) the previous day. Midgette noted' "Few people today have the vocal heft and stamina to get through even one of these roles, let alone take on both back to back." In the same season, she was to make her European operatic debut in Robert Wilson's production of Die Walküre at the Théâtre du Châtelet in Paris.

For the 2006/2007 season she began a multi-season performance in a major, and internationally acclaimed, staging of Wagner's Der Ring des Nibelungen conducted by Zubin Mehta in Spain, in what has become known as the "Valencia Ring". Here, she reprised her role of Brünnhilde appearing in Die Walkuere, Siegfried and Götterdämmerung and thus completing her first Ring Cycle.

The 2008/2009 season saw Wilson make her debut in yet another Wagnerian leading role as Senta in The Flying Dutchman for Washington National Opera (she had previously sung with the company in the chorus). During this season she also made her Royal Opera House, Covent Garden, debut as Turandot The 2009/2010 season saw Wilson debut as Aida for Opera Australia (Australia's national opera company). She is to repeat this role, returning to Valencia's Palau de les Arts (where she performed in the La Fura dels Baus Ring Cycle) under Zubin Mehta. She performed as Gutrune in Götterdammerung in Los Angeles Opera's controversial new Ring Cycle. She will also be giving major concert performances in New Orleans, Montreal and Tel Aviv . 2009 also saw Wilson take on yet another Wagnerian role when she stepped in to replace Deborah Voigt as Isolde in Lyric Opera of Chicago's revival of the David Hockney production of Tristan und Isolde Wilson later repeated her Isolde in the Hockney production in Barcelona, under the baton of Sebastian Weigle. Isolde was also the role of her debuts at Oper Leipzig and the Hong Kong International Arts Festival in 2011.

== Concert career ==
Like many successful operatic performers, Wilson also maintains a successful concert career wherein she has performed:

Richard Strauss: Four Last Songs, Beethoven: 9th Symphony, Verdi: Requiem, Mahler: 8th Symphony together with works by Duruflé, Haydn, Saint-Saëns and Vaughan Williams. Wilson's European orchestral solo debut took place in 2005, singing the four leading soprano roles in Erwin Schulhoff's opera Flammen, in a live broadcast from Amsterdam's Concertgebouw, with the Netherlands Radio Philharmonic Orchestra under Edo de Waart. In 2009 she made her debut in another Wagnerian role as Elisabeth in the Montreal Symphony Orchestra's concert performance of Tannhäuser conducted by Kent Nagano Wilson returned to the Montreal Symphony Orchestra in 2009 for Mahler's 8th Symphony and in 2010 for Beethoven's 9th Symphony. She has performed the soprano solo role in the Verdi Requiem with Master Chorale of Washington and with the New Orleans Opera. 2011 saw her debut as Tove in Gurre-Lieder by Arnold Schoenberg, with Mehta and the Israel Philharmonic Orchestra, in Tel Aviv and Jerusalem, a performance recorded for eventual commercial CD release.

== Principal roles ==
- Turandot: Turandot, Puccini
- Brünnhilde: Die Walküre, Wagner.
- Brünnhilde: Siegfried, Wagner.
- Brünnhilde: Götterdämmerung, Wagner.
- Gutrune: Götterdämmerung, Wagner.
- Aida: Aida Verdi.
- Senta: Der Fliegende Hollander, Wagner
- Isolde: Tristan und Isolde, Wagner
- Leonore: Fidelio, Beethoven
- Elisabeth: Tannhäuser, Wagner

== Discography ==
- Richard Wagner: The Valencia Ring Die Walküre, Orquesta de la Comunitat Valenciana, Zubin Mehta (C Major) 2010. DVD/Blu-ray
- Richard Wagner: The Valencia Ring Siegfried, Orquesta de la Comunitat Valenciana, Zubin Mehta (C Major) 2010. DVD/Blu-ray
- Richard Wagner: The Valencia Ring Götterdämmerung, Orquesta de la Comunitat Valenciana, Zubin Mehta (C Major) 2010. DVD/Blu-ray

== Awards and grants ==
- Major grant from the Olga Forrai Foundation.
- 2003 Robert Lauch Memorial Grant from the Wagner Society of New York
- Liederkranz Foundation's Ethel Bleakley Daniels Award for Wagnerian Voices.
- Evelyn Lear and Thomas Stewart Emerging Singers Career Grant from the Wagner Society of Washington
