= Hans Clemens =

German opera singer

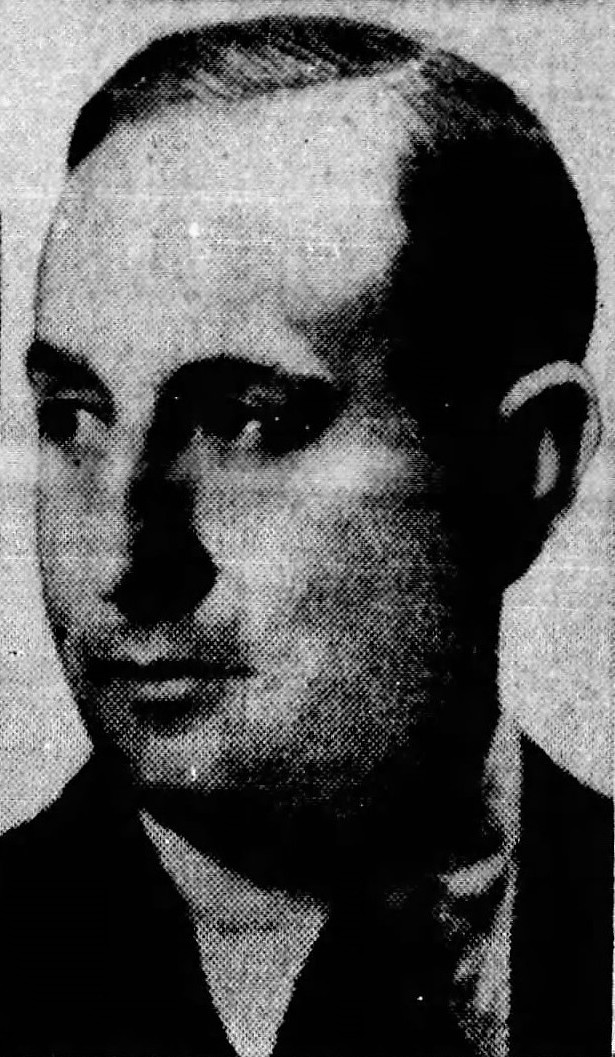
- Clemens, as a voice teacher in Los Angeles, in 1941
- Born: 27 July 1890; Gelsenkirchen, Germany
- Died: 25 August 1958 (aged 68); Montrose, Colorado, U.S.
- Occupation: Operatic tenor
- Organizations: Cologne Opera; Städtische Oper Berlin; Metropolitan Opera

Hans Clemens (27 July 1890 – 25 August 1958) was a German tenor who had an international career in opera and concert from the 1910s through the 1930s. He performed with several major opera houses, including the Städtische Oper in Berlin and the Metropolitan Opera. He is particularly remembered for his performances and recordings of Wagner's David in Die Meistersinger von Nürnberg and Mime in Der Ring des Nibelungen. After retiring from the stage, he worked as a voice teacher in Los Angeles.

== Life and career ==
Born in Gelsenkirchen, Clemens made his professional opera debut at the Cologne Opera in 1911 where he remained as a principal artist for the next ten years. In 1914 he participated in the world premiere of Humperdinck's Die Marketenderin in Cologne. He was a member of the Städtische Oper (Municipal Opera) in Berlin in 1921 and 1922, and then turned to freelance work. He appeared at the Royal Opera House in London from 1925 to 1929 and in 1935 where he performed the Wagner roles David in Die Meistersinger von Nürnberg and Loge in Das Rheingold. He was a guest at the Vienna State Opera in 1922, and at a Wagner Festival in Paris in 1927 as Loge.

Clemens was a member of the Metropolitan Opera (Met) in New York City from 1930 through 1938; making his debut as the Steersman on 1 November 1930 in Wagner's The Flying Dutchman under conductor Artur Bodanzky with Friedrich Schorr in the title role. He gave a total of 197 performances at the Metropolitan Opera House over an eight year period. He was particularly admired as David and as Mime in Der Ring des Nibelungen. Other Wagner roles there included Froh in Das Rheingold, the Third Esquire in Parsifal, Vogelgesang in Die Meistersinger von Nürnberg, and Walther von der Vogelweide in Tannhäuser. In 1936, he performed as David in a broadcast from the Met, alongside Friedrich Schorr as Sachs and Elisabeth Rethberg as Eva, conducted by Artur Bodanzky. When the recording was reissued, a reviewer noted: "Hans Clemens takes the part of David, a role he was particularly associated with at the Met, and it shows. This performance is six years into his Met career, and his confidence is most impressive.". Clemens also performed roles in Suppé's operettas such as Gaston du Faure in Donna Juanita and Leonetto in Boccaccio, Jaquino in Beethoven's Fidelio, Prince Léopold in Halévy's La Juive, and as Strauss roles the major-domo in Der Rosenkavalier and Narraboth in Salome. His final appearance at the Met was on 16 March 1938 as the Shepherd in Wagner's Tristan und Isolde with Lauritz Melchior and Kirsten Flagstad as the titular characters.

From 1935 to 1939, Clemens performed in 15 productions with the San Francisco Opera where he first appeared as Loge in Das Rheingold on 1 November 1935.

After 1939, Clemens retired from the stage and taught voice in Los Angeles where one of his pupils was soprano Marilyn Cotlow. He was married to soprano Wanda Achsel until 1933. He later married Cornelia Clemens (maiden name unknown), a voice teacher in the bel canto style of singing. They were together until his death on 25 August 1958 in Montrose, Colorado. Cornelia kept Hans’ memory alive while teaching her voice students in Ashland, Oregon, until her own death.

A 1936 Met production with Clemens of Die Meistersinger von Nürnberg, originally recorded for radio, was released on disc by Eklipse records. Naxos Records released a 1937 recording of Das Rheingold from the Met with Clemens on disc. Several other Metropolitan opera radio broadcasts of his Wagner performances are extent. He also recorded excerpts from Flotow's Martha for the Parlophone label.
