= David Dobie =

British Army officer

- Born: 21 October 1912; Tynemouth, United Kingdom
- Died: 12 December 1971 (aged 59); Nairobi, Kenya
- Military career
- Allegiance: United Kingdom
- Branch: British Army
- Service years: 1936–1971
- Rank: Lieutenant Colonel
- Commands: 1st Parachute Battalion
- Conflicts: Second World War: Battle of France; Dunkirk evacuation; Operation Torch; Battle of Arnhem; Operation Pegasus
- Awards: Distinguished Service Order; Knight 4th Class of the Military Order of William (Netherlands)

David Theodore Dobie, DSO (21 October 1912 – 12 December 1971) was a British Army officer who fought during the World War II. He had a leading role in the Battle of Arnhem (Operation Market Garden); he was the architect of Operation Pegasus I, which evacuated a large group of men trapped in German-occupied territory after the battle.

== Second World War ==
Dobie joined the British Army in 1936. When the Second World War began, Dobie was a lieutenant in the 50th Infantry Division. In January 1940 the division was sent to France. In June 1940 the British Army, with Dobie, was evacuated from Dunkirk.

=== Operation Torch (8–16 November 1942) ===
Dobie was promoted to major in 1941. He volunteered for the newly formed airborne division. In September he was appointed commander of B Company of the 3rd Battalion. He was then sent to Tunisia and participated in Operation Torch. For this action he was awarded the Distinguished Service Order (DSO) in April 1943. Dobie was sick when he returned to England.

=== Battle of Arnhem (Operation Market Garden) ===
After his recovery, Dobie joined the 6th Airborne Division. Early in 1944 he returned to the 1st Airborne Division and commanded the 1st Battalion of the 1st Brigade in the rank of lieutenant colonel. The 1st Battalion was deployed during the Battle of Arnhem. After landing near the small village of Wolfheze on 17 September 1944, it was ordered to advance through the Ede-Arnhem road and to occupy the high, northern part of Arnhem, in order to protect the 2nd and 3rd Battalions with the Arnhemse Rijnbrug as objective. The 2nd Battalion, led by John Frost, was the only one to reach the Rhine Bridge. German opposition was much tougher than expected, cutting him off from the rest of the division.

On the way to Arnhem, Dobie's battalion met with fierce resistance at the Amsterdamseweg near Wolfheze. Dobie led his men off the road and tried to head towards the bridge in a circumferential motion. However, the British did not make much progress. The 1st Battalion suffered heavy losses on 19 September during the fighting in Arnhem, where it got stuck on the way to the Rijnbrug near the Elisabeths Gasthuis. Dobie was injured and captured by the Germans, but later managed to escape. He was taken to the Sint Elisabeth hospital. Dobie ran away when a German confiscated his watch and showed it to a nurse. He found shelter with a Dutch doctor who lived near the Sint Elisabethgasthuis. After two weeks, he was smuggled out of the city. He then independently attempted to cross the Rhine, but failed due to the strong German presence near the riverbank. He was then picked up by Elisabeth Spies while he was roaming the Ginkelse Heide. She brought him to Ede, where on 16 October he came into contact with Menno de Nooij, one of the leaders of the Edese resistance.

=== Operation Pegasus I ===
Through De Nooij, Dobie got back in touch with his immediate superior Gerald Lathbury, who was in hiding in Ede, and Derk Wildeboer, leader of the Domestic Armed Forces in the Ede region. After the battle, many British soldiers remained in occupied territory. Dobie was housed with resistance fighter Henk Wildenburg at 18 Korenbloemstraat in Ede.

Together with the Dutch resistance, Dobie developed a plan to get them behind Allied lines. Dobie himself was progressing. Via Maurik he was taken by bicycle to Tiel by Joop Meier, a member of Johannes van Zanten's gang, where he found shelter with the Noordzij family. In the night of 19 October he was transferred by Frans de Vilder in a boat up the Waal. An oar broke in half, after which Dobie broke a bench in half and used that plank as an oar. After safely reaching the Allied lines, he consulted with Lieutenant General Miles Dempsey in Eindhoven, agreeing to a rescue. On the night of 22/23 October, 140 soldiers were successfully transferred across the Rhine. Dobie was awarded by Queen Wilhelmina of the Netherlands the highest Dutch honour as Knight 4th Class of the Military Order of William in March 1947 for his role during Operation Pegasus I.

== Post-war ==
After the war, Dobie started the company DT Dobie. It became the dealer for Mercedes-Benz in East Africa, later supplemented by the Nissan brand.

== Personal life ==
Dobie had two daughters and a son with his wife Rex. He died of a heart attack in Kenya on 12 December 1971.

== In popular media ==
Dobie appears briefly portrayed by John Light in the fifth episode, "Crossroads", of the HBO miniseries Band of Brothers, based on the book by Stephen E. Ambrose. In it, he meets recurring characters from the American 506th Parachute Infantry Regiment – 2nd Battalion executive officer Captain (later Major) Richard "Dick" Winters (Damian Lewis), battalion intelligence officer Captain Lewis Nixon (Ron Livingston), E ("Easy") Company, 2nd Battalion commander 1st Lieutenant Frederick "Moose" Heyliger (Stephen McCole) and regimental commander Colonel Robert Sink (Captain Dale Dye, who was also senior military advisor for the miniseries). He outlines Operation Pegasus and secures the 2nd Battalion's assistance, and together, they help rescue the 140 soldiers from behind German lines. Dobie is listed in Ambrose's book and therefore the miniseries credits as Col. O Dobey.
