= Marilyn Cotlow =

American opera singer (1924–2024)

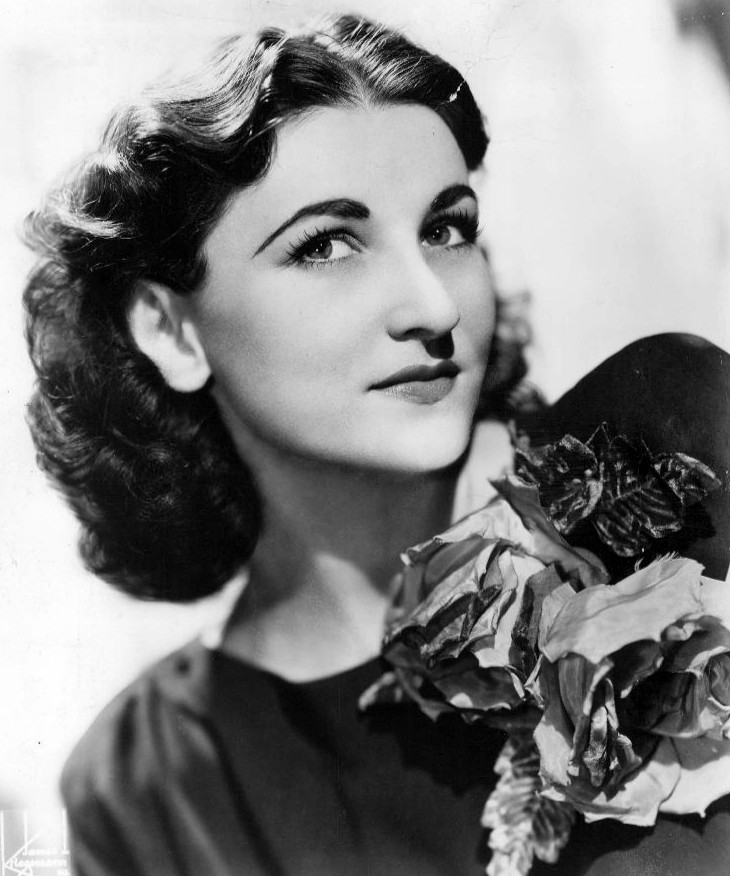
Cotlow in 1952.

Marilyn Rose Cotlow (January 10, 1924 – October 26, 2024) was an American lyric coloratura soprano best remembered for creating the role of Lucy in Gian Carlo Menotti's The Telephone in both the original Broadway and West End productions. She sang professionally during the 1940s and 1950s in the United States and Europe, performing with such companies as the Metropolitan Opera, Theater Bremen, Theater Basel, and the Wexford Festival Opera. After 1957, Cotlow mainly retired from performance to devote time to teaching voice and being a mother; although she continued to perform periodically in recitals, on the stage, and on disc up into the 1990s. She has taught vocal music on the faculties of the Peabody Conservatory, the University of Michigan, and Catholic University of America in addition to teaching privately from her home in Northern Virginia. Several of her students have had successful careers, including Alessandra Marc and Jennifer Wilson.

== Early life and education ==
Marilyn Rose Cotlow was born in Minneapolis, Minnesota, on January 10, 1924, to Sander and Bernice Cotlow. She had two brothers: William and Phillip. While she was in Junior High School the Cotlow family lived in the home of Mr. Cunningham, a bass player with the Minneapolis Symphony Orchestra. Marilyn developed a love of classical music and opera by spending hours listening to his large collection of classical music recordings.

Cotlow's father moved the family of five to Los Angeles in 1936 during the Great Depression in an effort to find work as an attorney. She began vocal studies with operatic tenor Hans Clemens in Los Angeles in 1939; studying with him until she relocated to New York six years later. She graduated from Glendale High School in 1942.

== Early performance career ==
Cotlow made her professional opera debut on June 26, 1942, with the California Opera Academy as the Queen of the Night in Wolfgang Amadeus Mozart's The Magic Flute. The production was staged by Theodore Bachenheimer at the Wilshire Ebell Theatre in Los Angeles. The cast also included Brian Sullivan as Tamino, George London (then billed as George Burnson) as Papageno and Johnny Silver as Monostatos. Cotlow also worked as a voice-over artist during the early to mid-1940s for Hollywood musical movies, often performing high notes in songs for artists who had difficulty singing in the upper register.

In March 1946 Cotlow performed as a soloist with the Minneapolis Symphony Orchestra under conductor Dimitri Mitropoulos. The following summer she performed the role of Blondchen in Mozart's The Abduction from the Seraglio Central City Opera (CCO) with Eleanor Steber, Felix Knight, and Jerome Hines. Soon after she performed Zerbinetta's aria "Großmächtige Prinzessin" from Ariadne auf Naxos at the Mann Center for the Performing Arts (then called Robin Hood Dell) with the Philadelphia Orchestra under Mitropoulos. She returned to the CCO in the summer of 1948 to perform as Despina in Mozart's Così fan tutte in a production staged by Herbert Graf with sets by Donald Oenslager. Her fellow cast mates included Met soprano Anne Bollinger, Met baritone Clifford Harvuot, mezzo Jane Hobson, tenor Joseph Laderoute, and bass Lorenzo Alvary.

Upon arriving in New York, Cotlow auditioned for several parts and heard that Efrem Zimbalist Jr., and Chandler Cowles were producing a double bill of opera on Broadway. The operas were The Telephone, or L'Amour à trois and The Medium by a young Italian composer, Gian Carlo Menotti. The double bill premiered on February 18, 1947, at the Heckscher Theater, and the Broadway production opened on May 1, 1947, at the Ethel Barrymore Theatre and remained for more than 7 months. She also performed the work on London's West End at the Aldwych Theatre in 1948. Cotlow recorded the role for Columbia Records in 1948. A financially profitable recording, it was later re-issued in 1980.

In September 1947 Cotlow performed the role of Rosina in The Barber of Seville at Philharmonic Auditorium with the American Opera Company of Los Angeles. She performed that same role on tour with the Charles L. Wagner Opera Company with baritone Andrew Gainey as Almaviva in 1948.

== Metropolitan Opera and later performance career ==
In May 1948 Cotlow and tenor Frank Guarrera were selected as the two winners of the Metropolitan Opera Auditions of the Air. This competition win led to a contract with the Metropolitan Opera (the "Met"). Cotlow was also engaged to perform on The Bell Telephone Hour on NBC Radio after this competition win. She made her Met debut on December 4, 1948, under the baton of Wilfrid Pelletier as Philine in Mignon; a performance which was broadcast on the Metropolitan Opera radio broadcasts. The production was staged by Désiré Defrère with Risë Stevens in the title role. Other cast members included James Melton as Wilhelm Meister and Nicola Moscona as Lothario. Music critic Oliver J. Gingold wrote in The Wall Street Journal,

"Marilyn Cotlow made her debut as Philine in Mignon and is a sterling artist. She has a fine voice, perhaps a little too fine particularly in the lower register which was inaudible at times. However, her singing was quite perfect in harmony and she rendered the difficult "Polacca" with complete ease and at times perfection."

Cotlow toured to Los Angeles with the Met's production of Mignon for performances at the Shrine Auditorium in March 1949. She sang only one other role at the Met during her career: Adina in Donizetti's L'Elisir d'Amore in January 1949 with Giuseppe Di Stefano as Nemorino, Giuseppe Valdengo as Belcore, Italo Tajo as Dr. Dulcamara, Paula Lenchner as Giannetta, and Giuseppe Antonicelli conducting. She made an LP recording of Samuel Barber's Sleep Now and Richard Hageman's At the Well which was released by RCA Victor in 1949. In 1950 she performed a concert of opera arias and duets with tenor Walter Fredericks on WWOR-TV. In 1951 she performed the role of Blondchen in The Abduction from the Seraglio with The Little Orchestra Society at The Town Hall. That same year she starred in Oscar Straus's The Chocolate Soldier in Toronto, and as Violetta in Verdi's La traviata at the New Orleans Opera.

From 1952 to 1955 Cotlow was actively performing in operas in Europe. In 1952, she joined the company of Theater Basel and stayed there for one year. In 1953, she joined Theater Bremen, where she sang roles for two seasons. She performed the role of Amina in La Sonnambula at the Wexford Festival Opera in October and November 1954. In 1955 she gave a concert tour in the Netherlands. In 1956 she performed a concert of opera arias and duets with tenor Brian Sullivan and the Chicago Symphony Orchestra (CSO) under conductor Alfredo Antonini. In 1957 she performed a program of opera excerpts from works by Offenbach with the CSO under Julius Rudel with bass Joshua Hecht.

After the mid-1950s, Cotlow performed rarely as her time became increasingly devoted to raising her children and teaching. In March 1961 she gave a recital at the Phillips Memorial Gallery in Washington D.C. In 1962 she performed the role of Rosalinde in Die Fledermaus at the theatre of the Detroit Institute of Arts with the Detroit Opera Theatre. In 1979 she starred in the world premiere of Thomas Czerny-Hydzik's The Tell-Tale Heart; an opera adaptation of the 1843 short story by Edgar Allan Poe. Written specifically as a vehicle for her, the work premiered at Prince George's Publick Playhouse in Hyattsville, MD in December 1979. Earlier that year she starred in an evening opera scenes with the Prince George Civic Opera performed at the University of Virginia. She later recorded Kurt Weill's "September Song" with the Peter Robinson trio on their 1994 album Dancin' .

== Teaching career, personal life and death ==
On August 9, 1948, Cotlow married violinist Eugene Altschuler who was concertmaster of the New Orleans Symphony at the time of their marriage. They have two sons, Daniel and Remy David. Cotlow stated that her opera career was cut short in the mid-1950s because of her decision to return to the United States with her husband. Her husband's violin career in Europe was not going well while her singing career was; and ultimately she decided to support him in his career by returning to America. She further felt, that her career had not been managed well in the United States and that she had less performance opportunities in America. From 1972 to 1981 Altschuler was concertmaster of the Syracuse Symphony Orchestra, after which he served as assistant concertmaster with the Cleveland Orchestra and taught on the faculty of the Cleveland Institute of Music. Altschuler died in 2000.

In the late 1950s Cotlow took up teaching as her performance appearances became rare. She has taught voice privately out of her home in Falls Church, Virginia for many years and has also taught voice on the faculties of the University of Michigan, the Peabody Conservatory, and Catholic University of America. One of her most famous students, Alessandra Marc, became her daughter-in-law when Marc married her son Remy David. The couple has since divorced. Marc began studies with Cotlow in 1980.

Cotlow died following a fall at a nursing facility on October 26, 2024, at the age of 100. Her death was not announced until April 2025.

== Opera roles ==
- Adele, Die Fledermaus (Johann Strauss II)
- Adina, L'elisir d'amore (Gaetano Donizetti)
- Amina, La sonnambula (Vincenzo Bellini)
- Blondchen & Constanze, The Abduction from the Seraglio (Wolfgang Amadeus Mozart)
- Despina, Così fan tutte (Wolfgang Amadeus Mozart)
- Frau Fluth, Die Lustigen Weiber von Windsor (Otto Nicolai)
- Lakme, Lakme (Leo Delibes)
- Lucy, The Telephone (Gian Carlo Menotti)
- Madame Herz, Der Schauspieldirektor (Wolfgang Amadeus Mozart)
- Madame Vogelsang, Der Schauspieldirektor (Wolfgang Amadeus Mozart)
- Martha/Lady Harriet, Martha (Friedrich von Flotow)
- Musetta, La Boheme (Giacomo Puccini)
- Olympia, The Tales of Hoffmann (Jacques Offenbach)
- Philine, Mignon (Ambroise Thomas)
- The Queen of the Night, The Magic Flute (Wolfgang Amadeus Mozart)
- Rosalinde, Die Fledermaus (Johann Strauss II)
- Violetta, La Traviata (Giuseppe Verdi)
