= Wanda Achsel =

German soprano

Wanda Margarethe Gertrud Achsel, married name Achsel-Clemens (12 October 1886 – 3 August 1977) was a German operatic soprano.

== Life ==
Born in Berlin, Achsel was the daughter of the carpenter Wilhelm Friedrich Ernst Achsel and his wife Elisabeth Albertine Amanda née Götsch. She received her training with Laura Détschy in Berlin and made her debut in 1910 at the Berlin Summer Opera as Elsa in Wagner's Lohengrin. After engagements at the Mainfranken Theater Würzburg (1910-1912) and then at the Cologne Opera (1912-1923), she was employed at the Vienna State Opera from 1923 to 1939. In 1923, she sang the title role in the premiere of "Fredigundis" by Franz Schmidt. Achsel, who sang the lyric-dramatic soprano role, had a wide-ranging repertoire that combined roles as diverse as Butterfly or Mimi with Elisabeth (Tannhäuser) and Sieglinde. She was committed to contemporary opera and sang Marie (Wozzeck), the composer (Ariadne auf Naxos) and Octavian (Der Rosenkavalier) or alongside Richard Tauber in the 1937 Vienna premiere of Bernhard Paumgartner's Rossini in Naples.

Achsel, who had been awarded the title of Kammersängerin in 1919, gave guest performances in the Netherlands, Poland, Czechoslovakia and Yugoslavia. At the Salzburg Festival in 1929 she sang Rosalinde in Die Fledermaus.

After the end of her stage career, she worked as a singing teacher.

Until 1933 she was married to the tenor Hans Clemens (1890-1958), whom she had met in Cologne. She last lived in Vienna as a singing teacher. Achsel died in Vienna at the age of 90. Her gravesite is in the Evangelical Cemetery of the Vienna Central Cemetery. (II, 466/68).
