= Deutsche Zeitung in Norwegen =

Norwegian newspaper during World War II

Deutsche Zeitung in Norwegen (English: German Newspaper in Norway) was an Oslo-based daily newspaper published in Norway during the Second World War. It was published by the subsidiary Europa-Verlag of the Nazi-controlled Franz Eher Nachfolger, and had a circulation of about 40,000 copies. The paper served as a model for the Amsterdam-based Deutsche Zeitung in den Niederlanden.

An appreciable difference between Deutsche Zeitung in Norwegen and Deutsche Zeitung in den Niederlanden was their divergent readership; the former was predominantly read by German soldiers in Norway, whilst the latter chiefly had a civilian readership. A competing newspaper in Norway was the Wacht im Norden, that was distributed free of charge to soldiers. Towards the end of 1940, it was decided to establish an offshoot of the paper in Tromsø. Due to a lack of competent editors from Germany, the Tromsø paper was not established before February 1941. It was withal merged with Lappland-Kurier upon Finland's truce with the Soviet Union in September 1944.

According to publisher Max Amann, the editors of Deutsche Zeitung in Norwegen enjoyed more editorial freedom than the editors of newspapers in Nazi Germany. Oron Hale writes, however, that on a closer examination, the dissimilarities between the Norwegian paper and the German ones were small. Until June 1940, the Deutsche Zeitung in Norwegen was subject of military censorship by the German propaganda department in Norway. The newspaper and its offshoots were discontinued on the cease-fire in Europe on 8 May 1945.

== Bibliography ==
- Eckhardt, Heinz-Werner (1975). Die Frontzeitungen des deutschen Heeres 1939–1945 (in German). Wien / Stuttgart: Wilhelm Braumüller Universitäts-Verlagsbuchhandlung. ISBN 3-7003-0080-8.
- Hale, Oron J. (1965). Presse in der Zwangsjacke 1933-45 (in German). Düsseldorf: Droste. German translation of The captive press in the Third Reich. Princeton: University Press, 1964.
- Hoser, Paul (2010). "Franz Eher Nachf. Verlag (Zentralverlag der NSDAP)". Historisches Lexikon Bayerns (in German).
- Nøkleby, Berit (1995). "Deutsche Zeitung in Norwegen". In Dahl, Hans Fredrik (ed.). Norsk krigsleksikon 1940-45 (in Norwegian). Oslo: Cappelen. Archived from the original on 10 August 2011.
- Sauer, Christoph (1994). "Die Deutsche Zeitung in den Niederlanden". In Moilanen, Markku; Tiittula, Liisa (eds.). Überredung in der Presse: Texte, Strategien, Analysen (in German). Berlin: de Gruyter. ISBN 978-3-11-014346-1.
