= Dick Kragt =

Dignus (Dick) Kragt (Datchet (Great Britain), 18 July 1917 - Oslo (Norway), 8 July 2008) was a British-Dutch secret agent during World War II. He was dropped in the Netherlands in June 1943 and played an important role in the escape of Allied pilots from occupied territory until the end of the war.

== Lifetime ==
=== Youth ===
Kragt had a Dutch father and an English mother. He grew up in England, but spoke fluent Dutch. He received English citizenship in 1938.

== Second World War ==
=== Dropped in the Netherlands ===
During the war, he applied for training as a secret agent. The secret service MI9 decided to drop Kragt in the Netherlands. There, he was to set up an escape line for pilots who had crashed over the Netherlands.

Kragt considered being picked up by a reception committee too dangerous. Therefore, he had made it a condition that he would be dropped "blind". The three first attempts on 10, 19, and 22 June 1943 all failed for different reasons. On the third attempt, the plane was badly damaged by anti-aircraft fire, forcing an emergency landing on its return to England.

The fourth attempt on the night of 23–24 June 1943 was successful. Kragt was to be dropped on the Wisselseveld, an open field near Epe. However, the target was missed. Instead, Kragt was dropped eight kilometres south above Vaassen. He landed between some houses. His equipment, including the transmitter, ended up in the garden of an NSB man with much noise. Kragt himself managed to escape, but without the transmitter. As a result, the German occupying forces now knew that a secret agent had landed.

=== Aiding pilots ===
Kragt made contact with Jacobus van den Boogert from Emst. Through an Engelandvaarder, MI9 knew that Van den Boogert was involved in the resistance and sheltered Jews. Van den Boogert offered Kragt, who had the pseudonym Frans Hals, a hiding place in a forest near his house. Through Van den Boogert, Kragt came into contact with the resistance group Landelijke Organisatie voor Hulp aan Onderduikers (LO) and Nel Lind of the resistance group Fiat Libertas.

Through Mrs. Van den Boogert, Kragt came into contact with Joop Piller and his wife. Together with an adopted child, the Jewish couple was in hiding in a teahouse near Schaveren. Piller first of all restored the fake identity card Kragt had brought with him from England. The lion printed on this document was looking in the wrong direction.

Lind and Van den Boogert, along with several others, were arrested in September 1943. Piller and Kragt then rented a house at 158 Essenerweg in Essen, near Kootwijkerbroek. Piller and Kragt gathered a number of collaborators around them. The resistance group came to be known as the Frans Hals group. The collaborators included Evert and Maria Bruinekreeft, Heimen van Esveld, Huib de Iongh, courier Puck de Jongh, Ep van Omme, Joop Roskam, and Elbert van der Wiel. From London, Kragt was sent another assistant, but he turned out to be totally unsuitable for the job and was quickly removed via the escape line.

Because Kragt had lost his transmitter, it was not possible to verify the data of Allied pilots in England. This was necessary because the Germans also sometimes sent traitors out, posing as pilots and thus being able to roll up the entire escape line. Eventually, Kragt and Piller got in touch with another secret agent, Garrelt van Borssum Buisman. Until his arrest in February 1944, his transmitter could be used. Shortly afterwards, Kragt got his own transmitter.

Through a postman and a reliable policeman, Kragt and Piller had access to fifty addresses, mainly in the Kootwijkerbroek area, where pilots could be temporarily housed. The pilots reached them again mainly through LO channels. Kragt set up the resistance group Groep-Vrij in Maastricht. At least one hundred and twenty pilots were evacuated to Belgium along this line.

=== Operation Pegasus II ===
After the Battle of Arnhem in September 1944, which was lost by the Allies, many British paratroopers were left behind in the region. Kragt and Piller played a key role in Operation Pegasus II in November 1944. During this operation, the resistance wanted to smuggle a large number of British soldiers and downed pilots right through the German lines towards liberated territory.

Together with secret agent Abraham du Bois and others, Kragt and Piller were responsible for gathering the Allied soldiers. Kragt disapproved of Major Airey Neave's decision to designate Lunteren as the assembly point because it was far too far from the Rhine. This increased the chances of discovery. Neave stuck to his position, however, as he did not want to endanger the Dutch host families any longer than necessary.

=== Last months of war ===
Kragt himself did not take part in the crossing, which was just as well, as a large number of the participants were caught by the Germans. Only seven men reached the other side of the Rhine. About 60 men managed to stay out of German hands. They were accommodated by Kragt in and around Ede, Meulunteren and Kootwijkerbroek.

In December 1944, Kragt was made responsible not only for providing a suitable escape route, but also for taking care of the Airbornes who stayed behind. From early 1945, he was assisted in this by secret agent Henk van Loenen. With the help of Hans Snoek, a route via the Biesbosch was found in February 1945. Via this route, brigadier general John Hackett and doctor Alexander Lipmann Kessel, among others, were evacuated.

In the final months of the war, it became increasingly difficult for Kragt to maintain contact with his superiors in liberated territory. The Germans tried to locate the transmitter of his marconist Dirk Hildebrand Last, forcing him to move each time. In early April 1945, Kragt received orders that the twenty soldiers still in occupied territory were no longer allowed to be transferred because liberation was imminent.

== After the war ==
Kragt worked for Philips and KLM after the war. He met Norwegian Karin Rosted during a holiday, and married her. The couple had a son. In the 1970s, the family emigrated to Norway, where his wife died in 1995. Kragt visited the Netherlands for the last time in 1994 to attend a reunion of Arnhem veterans and resistance fighters.

== Honours ==
The Dutch government gave Kragt the Bronzen Leeuw for his wartime commitment. From the United States, he received the Medal of Freedom with golden palm. From Britain, he received the King's Medal for Courage in the Cause of Freedom.

== Links ==
- Report by Secret Agent “Frans Hals” (Dignus “Dick” Kragt)
