= Alexander Lipmann-Kessel =

South African military doctor (1914–1986)

Lipmann Kessel, MBE, MC, FRCS (19 December 1914 – 5 June 1986), was an orthopaedic surgeon and Second World War medical officer, often known by his nickname of Lippy.

== Battle of Arnhem ==
Born in Pretoria, Transvaal, Union of South Africa, he was involved at the Battle of Arnhem where at the time he was a captain in the Royal Army Medical Corps (RAMC), assigned to the 16th (Parachute) Field Ambulance. He is credited with saving the life of Brigadier Sir John Hackett when he operated on him for a severe abdominal wound at the St. Elisabeth Hospital in Arnhem.

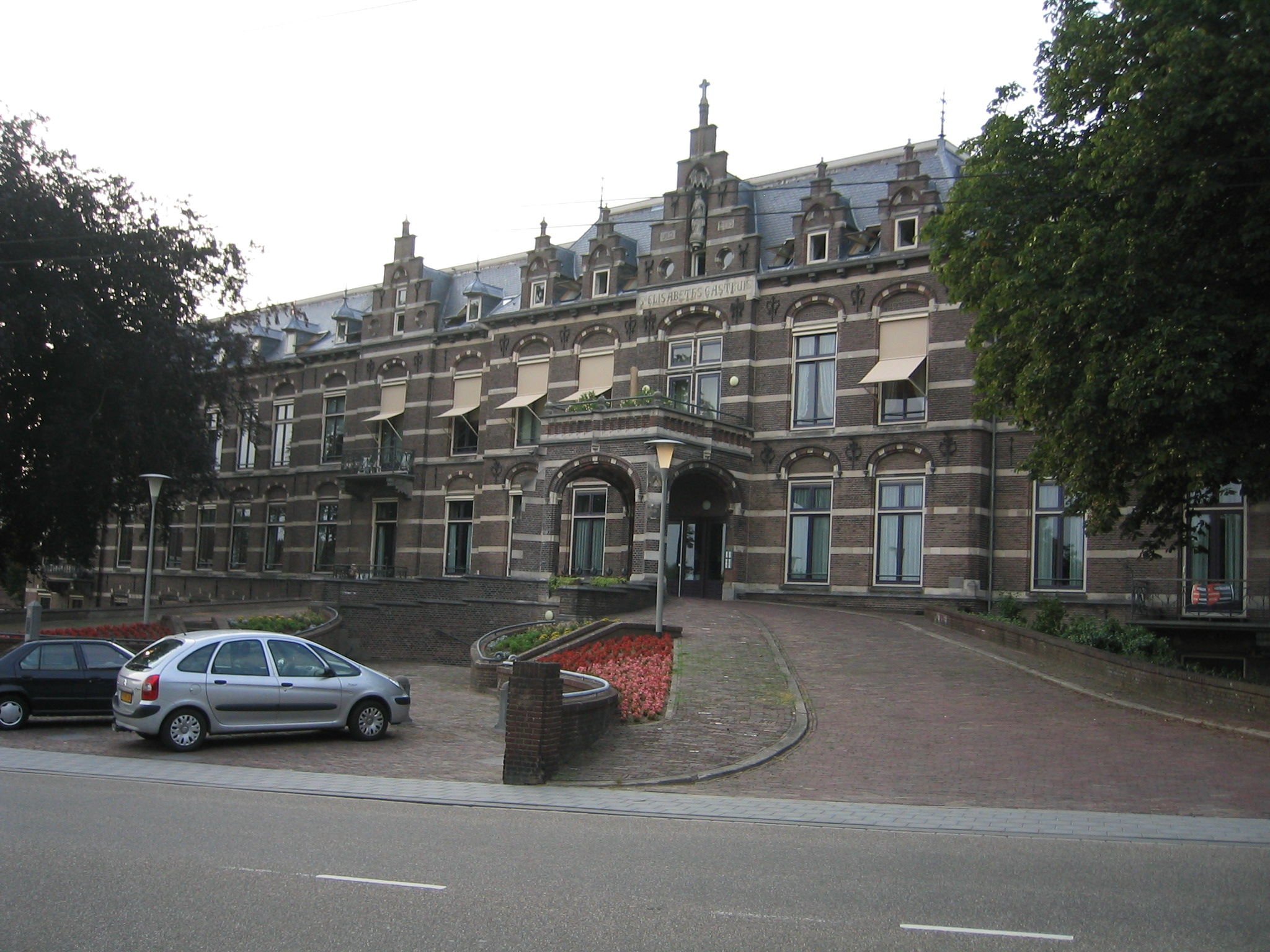
St. Elizabeth Hospital

Kessel had the curious experience of looking out of a window in the St Elizabeth Hospital and seeing the division's General Officer Commanding (GOC) Major General Urquhart, who was in charge of the whole battle at Arnhem, running along the street. It was not until after the battle that he found out that the general was just about to enter a house where he would stay surrounded by Germans for over 30 hours.

When he first entered the St. Elizabeth Hospital, he spoke to the Dutch staff in Afrikaans (which he had learned as a child in South Africa), because he had always been told it was similar to Dutch. The staff took offence at this, as to them it sounded like German, and he was told in no uncertain terms to always speak English.

Kessel, who was Jewish, was taken prisoner at Arnhem, but later escaped and has told his story in his book Surgeon at Arms, published in 1958.

== Later life ==
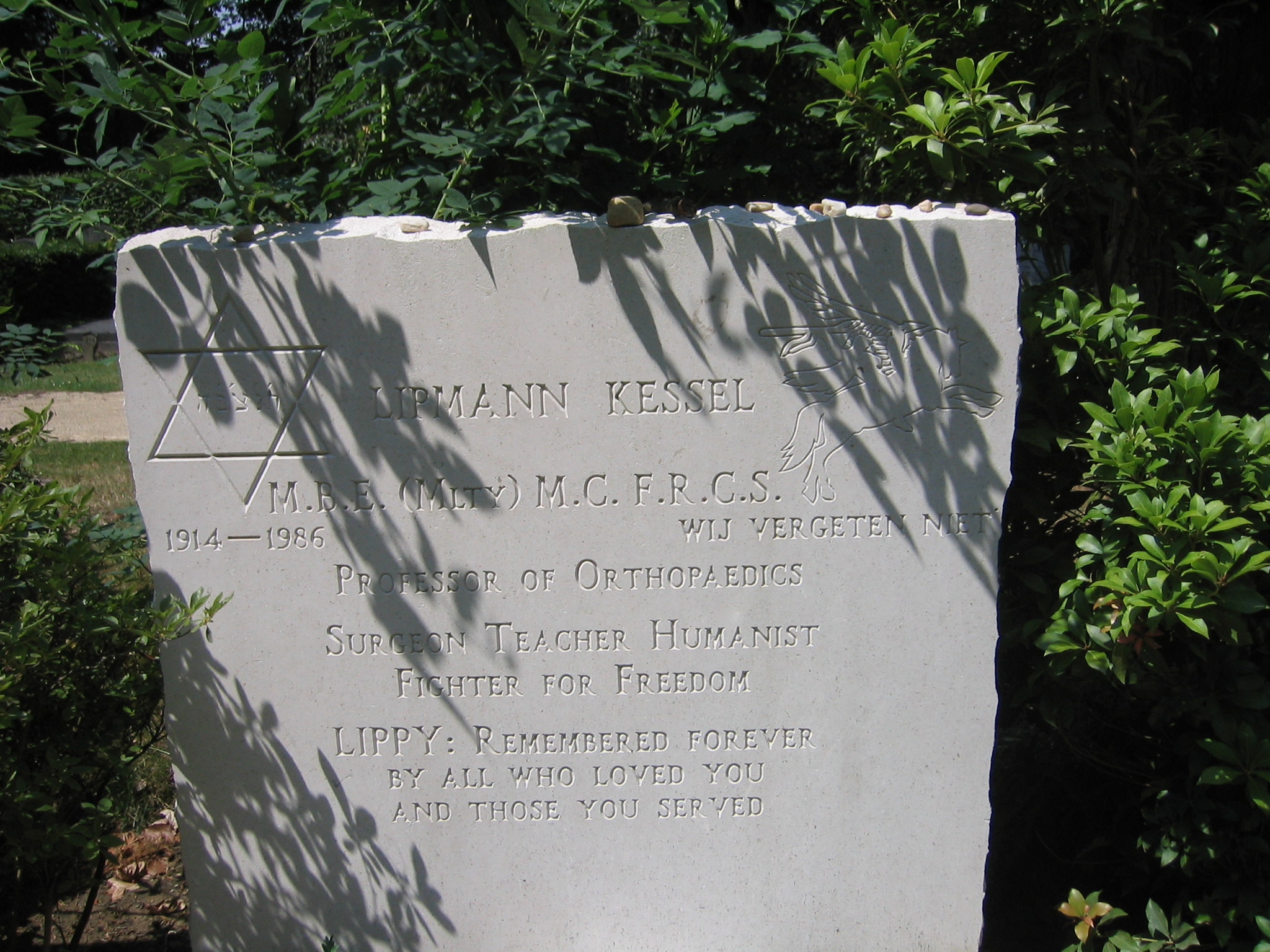
Lipmann Kessel's grave at Oosterbeek

After the war Kessel became Emeritus Professor of Orthopaedics at the University of London.

When he died on 5 June 1986 he was buried, as was his wish, in Oosterbeek civilian cemetery, in order to be close to the men who died at the battle of Arnhem, who are buried in the nearby Arnhem Oosterbeek War Cemetery.

== Publications ==
- Surgeon at Arms, 1958, ISBN 0-86007-123-5

Surgeon at Arms, 2011, ISBN 1-84884-591-X ISBN 978-1848845916
