= Bureau Bijzondere Opdrachten =

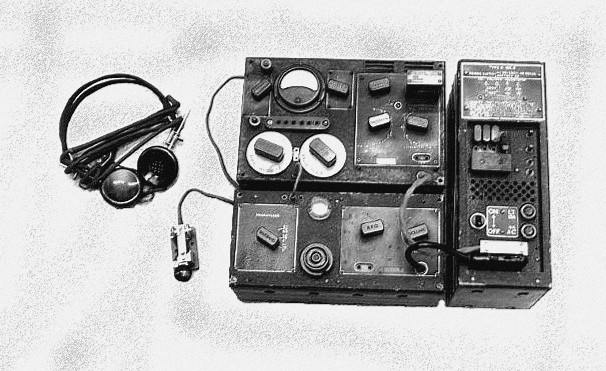
The 3 MK II mobile receiver and transmitter was used by BBO agents

The Bureau Bijzondere Opdrachten (BBO, "Office of Special Assignments") was a Dutch secret service during World War II. The BBO dispatched secret agents to the German-occupied Netherlands, where they supported the local resistance and carried out sabotage activities.

The BBO worked closely with the British secret service Special Operations Executive (SOE), which played a leading role in the Allied sabotage activities behind enemy lines. The agency's mission included inciting revolt and guerrilla activity in German-occupied territory, hampering the enemy through sabotage action such as blowing up railway lines and assassinating Germans; organising and supporting local resistance groups, for instance by supplying them with arms and ammunition; and supporting the underground press.

The CRASH Luchtoorlog- en Verzetsmuseum '40-'45, a museum housed in the Fort bij Aalsmeer in Aalsmeerderbrug, has a permanent exhibition devoted to the agents who worked for the BBO during World War II. In particular, the exhibition focuses on BBO agent Jos Gemmeke.

== History ==
Following the Englandspiel, whereby the Germans successfully infiltrated the Dutch resistance (costing the lives of 54 secret agents and hundreds of resistance members), the Dutch government in exile in the spring of 1944 established the BBO as a new secret service.

The agency was the successor of the Bureau Militaire Voorbereiding Terugkeer (BMT, "Office for the Military Preparation for the Return"), which in 1942 had in turn replaced the Bureau Voorbereiding van de Terugkeer naar Nederland en het Herstel van het Wettig Gezag Aldaar (BVT, "Office for the Preparation for the Return to the Netherlands and the Re-establishment of Lawful Rule There"). In addition to the BBO, the Dutch also operated a second secret service, the Bureau Inlichtingen (BI, "Office of Intelligence"), which focused on espionage and intelligence gathering.

On 13 March 1944, the Dutch government in exile appointed a retired general major, Johan Willem van Oorschot, to head the BBO. The day-to-day operations were run by Kas de Graaf. Between 31 March 1944 and 23 April 1945, a total of 70 BBO agents parachuted into the Netherlands, at least 17 of which were killed. BBO agents arranged a total of 211 weapons and supplies droppings at 86 different drop sites.

Following the Allied liberation of the Netherlands, an office of the BBO was established in Utrecht in May 1945. The office, led by Kas de Graaf, was tasked with investigating possible German infiltration of the BBO, among others. On 3 December 1945, the BBO was placed under the command of the chief of the general staff. The Utrecht office was closed on 1 March 1946, followed by the London headquarters on 1 June of that year.

== Executed BBO agents ==
Op 5 September 1944 at Kamp Vught:

- Nicolaas Johan Celosse

Op 6 September 1944 at Mauthausen:

- Leonardus Theodorus Cornelis Andringa, Pieter Arnoldus Arendse, Klaas van der Bor, Cornelis Carel Braggaar, Johannes Jan Cornelis Buizer, Joseph Bukkens, Johannes Jan Cornelis, Cees Droogleever Fortuyn, Gerard John van Hemert, Jan Charles Hofstede, George Jambroes, Roelof Christiaan Jongelie, Barend Klooss, Meindert Koolstra, Willem Johan Niermeijer, Gerrit van Os, Evert Radema, George Lodewijk Ruseler, Hendrik Johannes Sebes, Horst Reinder Steeksma, Thijs Taconis, Pieter van der Wilden, Willem van der Wilden

Op 7 September 1944 at Mauthausen:

- Aart Alblas, Arnoldus Albert Baatsen, Karel Willem Adriaan Beukema toe Water, Pieter Cornelis Boogaart, Oscar de Brey, Johanes Cornelis Dane, Jan Emmer, Johannes Henricus Marie de Haas, Jerry van Hemert, Cornelis Eliza van Hulsteijn, Pieter Kamphorst, Meindert Koolstra, Arie Johannes de Kruyff, Johannes Hermanus Arnoldus Maria ter Laak, Antoon Berend Mink, Willem Johan Niermeyer, Michiel Pals, Laurentius Maria Punt, Gozewin Hendrik Gerard Ras, Hendrik Reinder Steeksma, Ivo van Uijtvanck, Toon Wegner

Op 31 December 1944 at Mauthausen:

- Toon van Steen

Op 8 March 1945 on the Waalsdorpervlakte:

- Willem Frederik Hoogewerff, Richard Barmé.
