= Deutsche Zeitung in den Niederlanden =

German-language newspaper in the Nazi-occupied Netherlands

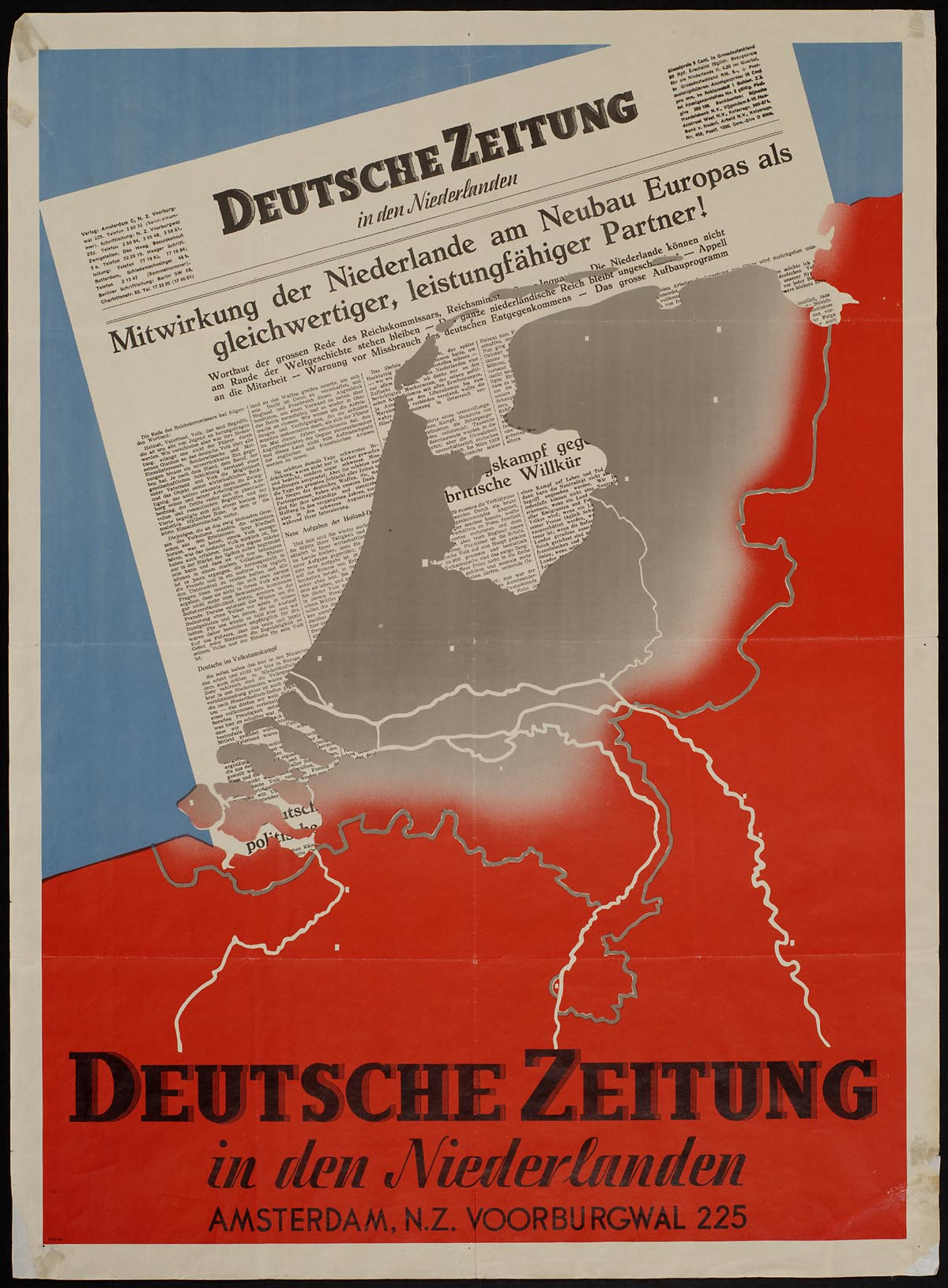
- Type: Daily newspaper
- Founder: Georg Biedermann
- Publisher: Europa-Verlag
- Founded: June 5, 1940
- Ceased publication: May 5, 1945
- Political alignment: Pro-Nazi
- Language: German
- Country: Nazi-occupied Netherlands

The Deutsche Zeitung in den Niederlanden (DZN, German Newspaper in the Netherlands) was a German-language nationwide newspaper based in Amsterdam, which was published during almost the entire Nazi occupation of the Netherlands in World War II from June 5, 1940 to May 5, 1945, the day of the German capitulation in the "Fortress Holland". Its objective was to influence public opinion in the Netherlands, especially the opinion of the Germans in the country (residents, staff working for the occupying power, soldiers).

The DZN was part of a group of German occupation newspapers published by the Europa-Verlag. This group was established systematically during the German campaigns and later collapsed gradually due to the recaptures of the Allied Forces. At their peak, these papers exceeded a total circulation of more than a million copies.

== History and profile ==
=== Start-up Phase ===
The DZN replaced the Reichsdeutsche Nachrichten in den Niederlanden (Imperial German News in the Netherlands), which had been published since March 4, 1939 by the Dutch part of the NSDAP/AO. At that time there was also the Deutsche Wochenzeitung für die Niederlande (German Weekly Newspaper for the Netherlands), a paper that had been published since the end of the 19th century and was finally discontinued in spring of 1942. It was initially planned that the DZN should replace the Reichsdeutsche Nachrichten in den Niederlanden immediately after its last edition of May 31, but since the DZN was unable to find a printer in time the first edition had to be delayed until June 5.

The DZN and all other occupation newspapers were published by the Europa-Verlag, a subsidiary of the Franz-Eher-Verlag headed by Max Amann. Unlike its predecessor, a paper of marginal importance, the DZN was set out to compete with the Dutch press from the very beginning. The recently founded Deutsche Zeitung in Norwegen (German Newspaper in Norway) served as a model. As early as July 1940 a stock corporation was founded to publish books, illustrations, magazines and other print products next to the DZN. Details about these activities are hardly known.

Similar to its sister papers, the DZN brought German editors from the Cologne-based Westdeutscher Beobachter and other Nazi papers into its editorial staff, which amounted to a total of approximately ten people. The paper also had offices in Berlin, The Hague and Rotterdam. The editorial staff was generally unacquainted with the situation in the Netherlands and had to learn the Dutch language first. The lack of knowledge of the latter also led to communication problems with the technical staff, which was brought in from Dutch print shops.

The publishing house, editorial staff and typesetting were initially located in different buildings at the Voorburgwal, which accommodated almost all important nationwide newspapers of Amsterdam for several decades. In the first weeks the editorial staff lacked even a telephone or teleprinter, only a two-way radio and a dispatch rider were available. In the fall of 1942 the editorial staff finally moved to the premises of De Telegraaf, owned by the Holdert group, where the publishing house was already based. The typesetting was moved there later, too, so all departments of the paper were finally united in a single building. Earlier that year, in spring, there had also been talks about a purchase of De Telegraaf, which had been canceled though due to the price. The Holdert group took also care of the printing of the DZN, which was one of the reasons to forbid the De Telegraaf and its sister newspaper Het Nieuws van den Dag after the war from 1945 to 1949 as collaboration papers.

=== Frequency, volume and sections ===
The DZN came out in the afternoon on Weekdays and in the morning on Sundays at a price of nine cent (20 Reichspfennig in Germany). The six-column newspaper consisted initially of eight pages on Weekdays and twelve to fourteen pages on Sundays. The increasing lack of paper later reduced the number of pages of the Dutch press drastically, less so for the DZN, which was privileged considerably in terms of rationing of paper.

Since the DZN had a reputable self-image, it oriented itself to the high standards of the German papers Das Reich and Frankfurter Zeitung regarding layout and variety of columns. The latter were divided into the usual sections politics, economy, feuilleton, sports and advertisements, but adjusted to the local competitors. According to the first editor-in-chief Emil Frotscher the paper emphasized on a "clean layout, stringent organization, good mixture of news and opinion section [and] a very extensive amount of illustration." In the case that no current photos were available the DZN adopted the Dutch method of illustrating the paper with archived ones. This concept was completed by the frequent use of map sketches. Another concession was made by the use of Antiqua instead of a "German" font.

=== Content and surveillance of the DZN ===
The content of the DZN consisted primary of news and reports, the situation in the Netherlands was covered rather sparsely, with the exception of notifications from the Reichskommissariat. The paper saw its "Seite des Tages" (featured page) as its show-piece, which contained an exceptional amount of pictures and an emphasis on article series and reports. The DZN remained especially faithful to its concept to adapt itself to the rich illustration of the Dutch press with its page "Bilder vom Tage" (pictures of the day). The local news served as a "serialized tourist guide" (Gabriele Hoffmann) and featured places of interest. The maritime shipping was another recurring subject due to its great interest to the Germans. The rest of the content consisted of serial novels, short stories, reviews and cultural essays. The DZN also borrowed articles from other newspapers, sometimes translated ones. The obligatory speeches from Hitler and Goebbels were not missing as well as appeals from Göring to the public and, for example, an interview with Reichskommissar Seyss-Inquart. Columnists included, apart from Goebbels and Seyss-Inquart, other high-ranking officials or well-known contributors like Otto Dietrich, Walter Gross, Karl Haushofer, Erich Hilgenfeldt, Fritz Hippler, Curt Hotzel, Otto Marrenbach, Giselher Wirsing and Hans Friedrich Blunck, but it is likely that many of these columns were not published exclusively in the DZN.

Amann claimed after his arrest that, for his papers, it was not enough to contain just Nazi propaganda, since they were destined for foreign countries, but in fact they did not differ much in "phrasemongering and clichés" (Oron J. Hale) from the German papers. The general news consisted accordingly often of front propaganda and other well known elements of the Nazi propaganda like agitations against Bolshevism and alleged World Jewry. To the Dutch people the DZN took up the opposite stance and presented itself in an advertising tone. Its aim was to suggest a return to normality under the new order. In such fields as culture and economic relations the DZN pointed at real connections or those invoked by propaganda between the Netherlands and Germany. In doing so, the newspaper twisted "typical Dutch" as to make it seem analogous to "typical German". On the other hand, the editorial staff inserted Dutch phrases in their articles to show that they finally settled at their place of activity.

The DZN was surveiled by several authorities: the press department of the Reichskommissariat in The Hague under Willi Janke, the Ministry for Popular Enlightenment and Propaganda under Joseph Goebbels and the Pressepolitisches Amt under Otto Dietrich. This surveillance did not always work smoothly. The Ministry complained from time to time about a neglect of demands. An example for this is the confiscation of an edition which featured the "treason" of Rudolf Hess. Hans Fritzsche, an official of the Ministry who had ordered the confiscation, questioned afterwards in a ministerial conference the loyalty of the DZN. Mistakes in the news coverage frequently drew criticism, too. Two from five fines issued to Dutch newspapers in the first eight months of 1942 had to be paid by the DZN. The pretense to be as convincing as possible led once in a while to a point when articles had to be sent in several times until all objections were cleared up. In such matters the advertising character of the DZN played again the decisive role.

=== Circulation and readership ===
The initial circulation of the DZN was about 30,000 copies and did not exceed this value in the first months. If this value is taken as a basis the paper found itself in the mid of the other ten nationwide Dutch papers by the end of 1940, with this position it had fulfilled its mission to compete against its local competitors at that time. It has to be considered though that the German authorities in the respective occupied countries usually guaranteed to Amann a minimum purchase of 30-40,000 copies. In May 1942 it was finally stated that the DZN had a circulation of 54,500. But this growth did not apply for the DZN alone, some of the other Dutch newspapers experienced a considerable growth between 1940 and 1943, too. If the DZN held its circulation from 1942 the next year, it would have retained its status. Several papers were forbidden or forced to merge during the occupation, others ceased to exist, so that the DZN had to do with much less competition, although the Nazification of the remaining press had been urged since 1941 anyway. The effect of supply and demand had vanished since 1940, this effect was specifically insignificant to the DZN, which had to fulfill a role given by the German government.

The distribution area of the DZN was not limited to the Netherlands alone, Germany and other countries received copies of the paper, too. Its sense of mission was not limited to the general public, in fact it saw itself as a model for the remaining Dutch press, which was struggling with the Gleichschaltung and tried to cope with it in a balancing act, sometimes also with subtle sabotage. The DZN tried to demonstrate how a "proper" paper should look like journalistically under the new order, and even advised other Dutch papers during the daily press conferences to reprint articles from it. Apart from other papers, the Dutch public of the DZN consisted primary of the economy, it was also read by a politically interested public and collaborators of the occupying power. With its political line the DZN was contrary to the positions of the Dutch national socialists NSB though, who opposed an integration of the Netherlands into a Greater German Reich. For this reason the NSB were not privileged by the DZN, even though it saw itself as a protector of them.

=== Final year ===
When it seemed that in the beginning of September 1944 the Netherlands were facing their immediately forthcoming liberation (Dolle Dinsdag), the majority of the editorial staff tried to leave the country, resulting in a great personnel crisis. After that the then editor E.C. Privat was replaced immediately, the DZN continued its publication until the very end, even though it had now lost its distribution area of the southern Netherlands. Since the train strikes that had also started in that month led to a limitation of the chain of distribution, a new special Groningen edition was founded by the end of October 1944. Its editor became August Ramminger, who had been head of the Berlin office of the DZN before. This edition was printed on the presses of the forbidden Nieuwsblad van het Noorden. Originally the DZN wanted to rent the print shop, but after the publishing house of the Nieuwsblad van het Noorden resisted to that it was confiscated.

The last edition of the DZN was just a hectography in A5-format, which contained the Wehrmachtbericht. The end of the DZN also meant the end of a German press in the Netherlands.

== Real influence of the DZN ==
=== Influence on the Dutch public ===
Since the circulation of the DZN did not exceed 30,000 copies in the beginning and was distributed mainly to institutions of the occupying power, the paper was at least for that time almost completely deprived from the perception of the general public. That it later reached an average circulation of 50,000 copies does not distract from the fact that the attempts of the DZN to influence the Dutch public in the open sale failed completely. The paper was dismissed as propaganda anyway, and the Dutch had already been disappointed by their own press. Christoph Sauer, who analyzed the paper also linguistically, comes to the conclusion that the members of the NSB were probably also no readers of the DZN for the reasons mentioned above. There were already few reasons for them to read the DZN since the NSB had its own newspaper, the Nationale Dagblad, since 1938.

The German occupying power and the DZN were constantly cherishing illusions about the influence of the paper on the Dutch public. An example for this is Seyss-Inquarts claim from July 1940 in a situation report that half of the readership of the DZN were Dutch. Even when the strikes of February 1941 showed the failure of the German propaganda attempts the paper went to the extent of claiming that the "related blood raises its voice louder and louder". The propaganda attempts of the DZN and the occupation authorities were in an odd way contrary to Hitler's attitude, who, after he gave the orders for the setup of the administration of the occupation, lost his interest in the Netherlands quickly, which he never visited in his life.

The DZN frequently attacked Great Britain with its coverage. Its aim was to undermine traditional sympathies of the Dutch for the British Empire. The paper saw, as the whole German propaganda, the Dutch and Germans as sister nations. But again the DZN failed to shift the sympathies from the British to the Germans. In contrast to the readership that was actually targeted the DZN and its sister papers were often of more interest to the British and American Military intelligence than the local German press, since they contained valuable information about the actions and intentions of the occupation authorities that were spread over Europe.

=== Comparison with other influence attempts ===
It is characteristic for the conceptual failure of the DZN that other propaganda actions attracted a much wider audience. The Abteilung Aktivpropaganda (Department for Active Propaganda) of the Hauptabteilung für Volksaufklärung und Propaganda published De Gil in 1944, a satirical newspaper that was aimed solely at the Dutch public and achieved high circulations during its short time of existence. The radio broadcasts of Max Blokzijl were also a drawing card. But in both cases a high entertainment value played a significant role, they also failed to change the sympathies in the public. The German entertainment films were popular, too, since they served as distraction even when the moviegoers were forced to watch the Die Deutsche Wochenschau since 1943.

== Editors ==
Publishing director

- Georg Biedermann

Editors

- 1940: Emil Frotscher
- 1940—1941: Hermann Ginzel
- 1941—1944: Emil Constantin Privat
- 1944—1945: Dr. Antonius Friedrich Eickhoff

== Main sources ==
=== Literature ===
- Oron J. Hale: Presse in der Zwangsjacke 1933-45, Droste, Düsseldorf 1965, German translation from The captive press in the Third Reich, University Press, Princeton 1964
- Gabriele Hoffmann: NS-Propaganda in den Niederlanden: Organisation und Lenkung der Publizistik, Verlag Dokumentation Saur, München-Pullach / Berlin 1972, ISBN 3-7940-4021-X (German)
- René Vos: Niet voor publicatie. De legale Nederlandse pers tijdens de Duitse bezetting, Sijthoff, Amsterdam 1988, ISBN 90-218-3752-8 (Dutch)
- Christoph Sauer: Die Deutsche Zeitung in den Niederlanden, in: Markku Moilanen, Liisa Tiittula (editors): Überredung in der Presse: Texte, Strategien, Analysen, de Gruyter, Berlin 1994, ISBN 978-3-11-014346-1, Pages 198-200 (German)
- Jan van de Plasse: Kroniek van de Nederlandse dagblad- en opiniepers / samengesteld door Jan van de Plasse. Red. Wim Verbei, Otto Cramwinckel Uitgever, Amsterdam 2005, ISBN 90-75727-77-1. (Dutch; previous edition: Jan van de Plasse, Kroniek van de Nederlandse dagbladpers, Cramwinckel, Amsterdam 1999, ISBN 90-75727-25-9)
- Huub Wijfjes: Journalistiek in Nederland 1850–2000. Beroep, cultuur en organisatie. Boom, Amsterdam 2004, ISBN 90-5352-949-7. (Dutch)

=== Online ===
- Katja Happe: Deutsche in den Niederlanden 1918-1945, published on the internet by the library of the University of Siegen in December 2004 (PDF) (German)

== Other sources ==
- P.A. Donker: Winter '44-'45. Een winter om nimmer te vergeten, Ad. Donker, Bilthoven and Antwerpen 1945. (Dutch) PDF-Version of this book
- Henk Nijkeuter: Drent uit heimwee en verlangen, Van Gorcum, Assen 1996, ISBN 90-232-3175-9 (Dutch)
