= Donald Malarkey =

US army non-commissioned officer

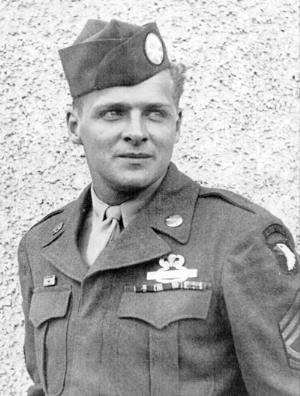
- Malarkey in 1945

Member of the Clatsop County Board of Commissioners
- In office 1954–1958

Personal details
- Born: July 31, 1921 Astoria, Oregon, U.S.
- Died: September 30, 2017 (aged 96) Salem, Oregon, U.S.
- Resting place: Willamette National Cemetery
- Spouse: Irene Moor (m. 1948; died 2006)
- Children: 4
- Education: University of Oregon
- Awards: Bronze Star (2); Purple Heart; Knight of the Legion of Honour (France); Croix de Guerre (France)
- Nickname(s): Don, Malark

Military service
- Allegiance: United States
- Branch/service: United States Army
- Years of service: 1942–1945
- Rank: Technical Sergeant
- Unit: Easy Company, 2nd Battalion, 506th Parachute Infantry Regiment, 101st Airborne Division
- Battles/wars: World War II: Battle of Normandy; Operation Market Garden; Battle of the Bulge

Donald George Malarkey (July 31, 1921 – September 30, 2017) was an American soldier who served as a non-commissioned officer with Easy Company, 2nd Battalion, 506th Parachute Infantry Regiment, in the 101st Airborne Division of the United States Army during World War II. Malarkey was portrayed in the HBO miniseries Band of Brothers by Scott Grimes.

== Early life ==
Donald Malarkey was born in Astoria, Oregon, on July 31, 1921, to Leo and Helen (née Trask) Malarkey, married in 1918. He graduated from Astoria High School in 1939 and was of Irish descent. As a youth, he worked on a purse seiner crew on the Columbia River. He was a volunteer firefighter during the destructive Tillamook Burn forest fire, which destroyed thousands of acres of Oregon timber. He was in his first semester at the University of Oregon in the fall of 1941 when the Japanese attacked Pearl Harbor.

== Military service ==
After Pearl Harbor, Malarkey tried enlisting in the Marines, but was rejected because of dental problems. He then tried the Army Air Corps, but lacked the requisite mathematics background. As such, when he was drafted in July 1942, he volunteered for the paratroopers of the United States Army, after reading a Life magazine article about them being the best. He trained at Camp Toccoa, Georgia. Of the enlisted men who trained at Toccoa, only one man in six received certification as a member of the fledgling paratroops. He received his jump certification in 1942.

Malarkey became a member of E ("Easy") Company, 2nd Battalion, 506th Parachute Infantry Regiment of the 101st Airborne Division. He went to England in 1944 to participate in Mission Albany, the airborne landing portion of Operation Neptune, the largest amphibious invasion in history, which was the assault portion of Operation Overlord. Malarkey parachuted into France with his unit. Later that day, in a pitched battle, he helped knock out four German 105 mm artillery battery, an action now called the Brécourt Manor Assault, for which he received the Bronze Star for his heroism.

He fought for twenty-three days in Normandy, nearly eighty in the Netherlands, thirty-nine in the Battle of Bastogne in Belgium, and nearly thirty more in and around Haguenau, France, and the Ruhr Pocket in Germany. He was promoted to sergeant before Operation Market Garden. Malarkey, who was never seriously wounded, served more consecutive time on the front lines than any other member of Easy Company. Malarkey was awarded the Bronze Star, Purple Heart, Good Conduct Medal, American Campaign Medal, and others.

== Later years ==
Malarkey returned to the University of Oregon in 1946 to complete his degree. He was a member of the Sigma Nu fraternity (Gamma Zeta). While attending the university, he met and became engaged to Irene Moor (1926–2006) of Portland. They married on 19 June 1948. Malarkey graduated in 1949 with a bachelor's degree in business. The couple lived in Astoria, Oregon, where Malarkey became the sales manager for Lovell Auto Company. During this time, he ran for the position of County Commissioner of Clatsop County, Oregon, and was elected in 1954. The family moved to Portland, Oregon, where Malarkey worked as an insurance and real estate agent.

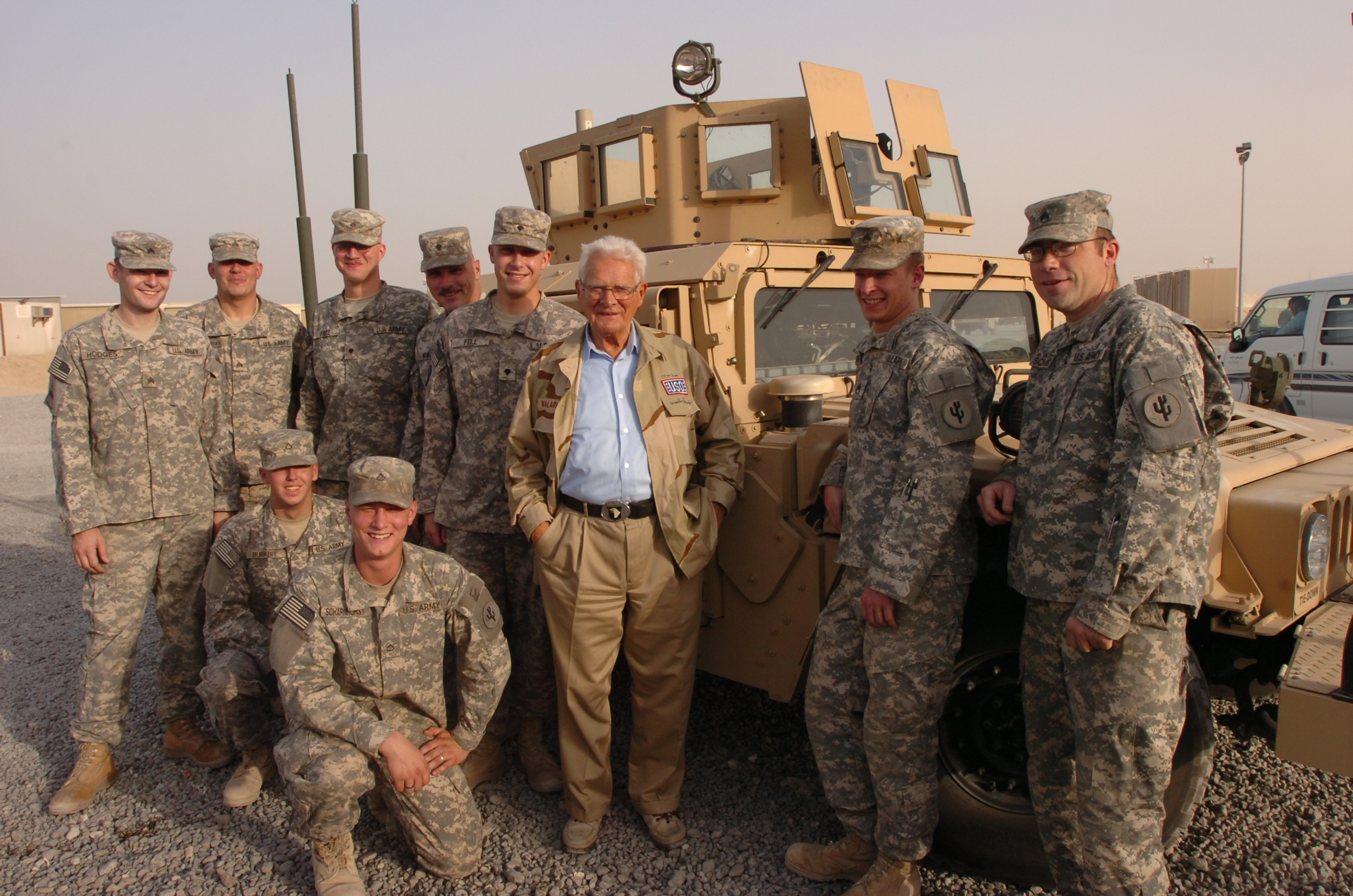
Donald Malarkey with US soldiers at Camp Arifjan, Kuwait, in 2008.

Malarkey and his wife Irene had four children, a son, Michael and three daughters, Martha, Sharon, and Marianne. Irene died in April 2006 of breast cancer.

In 1987, Malarkey was introduced to author and University of New Orleans Professor of History Stephen Ambrose at an Easy Company reunion in New Orleans. In 1989, Malarkey traveled with Ambrose and other members of Easy Company, including Richard Winters and Carwood Lipton, to various sites where they had fought in Europe. The oral history and first-person recollections that Malarkey and the others provided became the basis for Ambrose's book Band of Brothers, which was published in 1992. During Ambrose's collection of anecdotal information for the book, Malarkey told of the saga of the Niland brothers of Tonawanda, New York, how two had died on D-Day and another was presumed killed. Fritz, one of the four Niland brothers, was close friends with Malarkey's best friend and fellow Easy Company member Sergeant Warren H. "Skip" Muck who was from the same town as the Nilands. This episode was the impetus for the screenplay of Saving Private Ryan.

Malarkey lived in Salem, Oregon, and formerly spoke extensively to high school and college students and other groups on his Easy Company experiences. He traveled with the USO to Army posts and hospitals in the United States and Europe, where he met with soldiers wounded in the Iraq War. In 2005, he appeared in an advertisement urging repeal of the estate tax. For many years Malarkey extensively traveled as part of the Frontline Leadership program by On-Point Strategies, which also produced a documentary on The Battle at Brecourt Manor (Brecourt Manor Assault) accounting to Justin Alderman, the organization's promotional manager and friend of Malarkey's. In May 2011, Malarkey attended one of the last public events with his friend and fellow Easy Company soldier, Lynn "Buck" Compton. The event was the last time the duo were together before Compton's death the following year. In 2012, Malarkey retired from public speaking events.

Following the death of Sergeant Paul Rogers on March 16, 2015, Malarkey became the oldest surviving member of Easy Company. Malarkey died on September 30, 2017 in Salem, Oregon, of age-related causes. He is interred at Willamette National Cemetery.

== Medals and decorations ==
Technical Sergeant Malarkey was awarded the following medals for his service.

Badge	Combat Infantryman Badge		
1st row	Bronze Star Medal with 1 Oak leaf cluster		
2nd row	Purple Heart	Army Good Conduct Medal	American Campaign Medal
3rd row	European–African–Middle Eastern Campaign Medal with Arrowhead Device and 4 Campaign stars	World War II Victory Medal	Army of Occupation Medal with 'Germany' clasp
Badge	Parachutists Badge		
Unit awards	Presidential Unit Citation with 1 Oak leaf cluster		

1st row	Legion of Honour France (Chevalier Rank)		Croix de Guerre France
2nd row	Liberation Medal France	Croix de Guerre Belgium	World War II Service Medal Belgium
