= Ronald Speirs =

US Army officer (1920-2007)

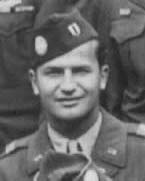
- Speirs in Austria, 1945
- Born: April 20, 1920; Edinburgh, Scotland
- Died: April 11, 2007 (aged 86); St. Marie, Montana, United States
- Relatives: Elsie (2nd wife); Robert (son)
- Military career
- Allegiance: United States
- Branch: United States Army
- Service years: 1942–1964
- Rank: Lieutenant Colonel
- Nicknames: "Sparky", "Killer", "Bloody", "The Dog"
- Service number: 0-439465
- Units: Dog Company/Easy Company, 2nd Battalion, 506th Parachute Infantry Regiment, 101st Airborne Division
- Conflicts: World War II; Battle of Normandy; Operation Market Garden; Battle of the Bulge; Korean War; Operation Tomahawk; Laotian Civil War; Operation White Star
- Awards: Silver Star; Legion of Merit
- Other work: Governor of Spandau Prison, Red Army Liaison Officer

Ronald Charles "Sparky" Speirs (20 April 1920 – 11 April 2007) was a United States Army officer who served in the 506th Parachute Infantry Regiment of the 101st Airborne Division during World War II. He was initially assigned as a platoon leader in B Company of the 1st Battalion of the 506th Parachute Infantry Regiment. Speirs was reassigned to D Company of the 2nd Battalion before the invasion of Normandy in June 1944 and later assigned as commander of E Company during an assault on Foy, Belgium, after the siege of Bastogne was broken during the Battle of the Bulge. He finished the war in the European Theater as a captain. Speirs served in the Korean War, as a major commanding a rifle company and as a staff officer. He later became the American governor for Spandau Prison in Berlin. He retired as a lieutenant colonel.

== Early life ==
Speirs was born in Edinburgh, Scotland, on 20 April 1920 to Scottish parents, Robert Craig Speirs, Jr. and Martha Agnes (McNeil) Speirs. He spent his first few years in Edinburgh. He emigrated with his family to the United States, arriving in Boston, Massachusetts, on 25 December 1924. He settled with his family in the Brighton neighborhood of Boston. Speirs attended The English High School in Boston and went on to the Bentley School of Accounting and Finance in Waltham, Massachusetts, where he studied accounting. In addition to participating in compulsory Junior Reserve Officers' Training Corps training in high school, Speirs attended four summer sessions of the Army-administered Citizens' Military Training Camps. At his fourth camp in 1940, he was named a cadet second lieutenant in his training company by Colonel Emery O. Beane of the 303rd Infantry, camp commandant. His completion of the four camps qualified him to apply for a commission as a second lieutenant in the Organized Reserve.

== Military service ==
=== World War II ===
Speirs received orders to active duty on 11 April 1942 and was assigned to the 339th Infantry Regiment, 85th Infantry Division, at Camp Shelby, Mississippi. Shortly thereafter, he volunteered for the paratroopers. There he served as a platoon leader within Dog Company, 2nd Battalion of the 506th Parachute Infantry Regiment, which later became part of the 101st Airborne Division, at Camp Toccoa, Georgia, and was then shipped to England in late 1943. After arriving in England, the division began training for the invasion of France.

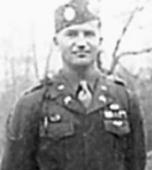
Ronald Speirs in Bastogne, December 1944/January 1945

Speirs parachuted into Normandy on 6 June 1944 (D-Day) and met up with fellow troops soon after landing. He assembled a small group of soldiers to help in the Brecourt Manor Assault; they captured the fourth 105mm howitzer.

Speirs commanded 2nd platoon, Dog Company. His unit spent the night of 6 June being shuffled into position with other platoons of a company being arranged for battle early the next morning. During the early morning hours, upon accepting the surrender of three German soldiers, Speirs allegedly gave the order to execute them. Later that morning Speirs was said to have shot another group of four to five soldiers who were surrendering. The ground assault was to begin with a rolling artillery barrage on the morning of 7 June. Speirs was given orders to halt their attack on Ste. Come-du-Mont and to hold position while regimental headquarters coordinated a rolling barrage shelling 15 targets near St. Marie-du-Mont.

Before the battle, Speirs shot a sergeant in self-defense. According to Private First Class Art DiMarzio, the eyewitness who related the fullest account of the event, and confirmed by Richard Winters in an interview on Youtube, DiMarzio was lying next to the sergeant, who was drunk, becoming belligerent, and showing strong signs of insubordination prior to the battle. An order to hold position was given and relayed down the line; the sergeant refused to obey, wanting to rush forward and engage the Germans. Once again, Speirs gave him the order to hold his position, subsequently telling the man that he was too drunk to perform his duties and should remove himself to the rear. The sergeant refused and began to reach for his rifle. Speirs again warned the sergeant, who leveled his rifle at the lieutenant; Speirs shot the sergeant in self-defense. DiMarzio, as well as the entire platoon, witnessed the event. Speirs immediately reported the incident to his commanding officer, Captain Jerre S. Gross. DiMarzio said Gross went to the scene of the shooting and after receiving all the information, deemed it justifiable self-defense. Gross was killed in battle the next day, and the incident was never pursued.

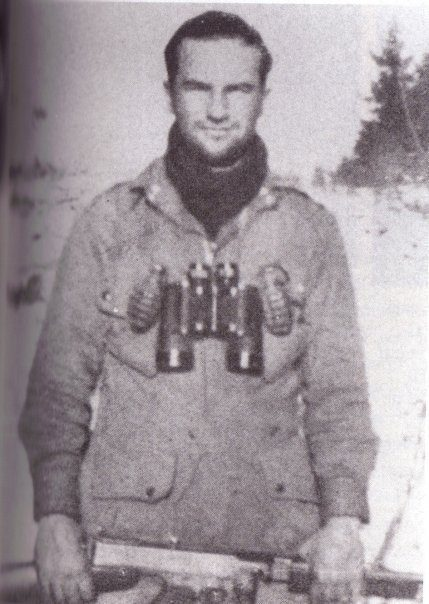
Speirs, unknown date

In January 1945, when Easy Company's initial attack on the German-occupied town of Foy bogged down, battalion executive officer Captain Richard Winters ordered Speirs to relieve 1st Lieutenant Norman Dike of command. The selection of Speirs was incidental; Winters later said that Speirs was simply the first officer he saw when he turned around. Speirs successfully took over the assault and led Easy Company to victory. During this battle, Dike had ordered a platoon to go on a flanking mission around the rear of the town. Speirs decided to countermand this order but the platoon had no radio. So Speirs ran through the town and German lines, linked up with Item Company soldiers, and relayed the order. Having completed this, he then ran back through the German-occupied town. He was reassigned as commanding officer of Easy Company and remained in that position for the rest of the war. Of the officers who commanded Easy Company during the war, Speirs commanded the longest.

Winters assessed Speirs as being one of the finest combat officers in the battalion. He wrote in his memoirs that Speirs had worked hard to earn a reputation as a killer and had often killed for shock value. Winters said that Speirs was alleged on one occasion to have killed six German prisoners of war with a Thompson submachine gun and that the battalion leadership must have been aware of the allegations, but chose to ignore the charges because of the pressing need to retain qualified combat leaders. Winters concluded that in today's army, Speirs would have been court-martialed and charged with war crimes, but at the time officers like Speirs were too valuable since they were not afraid to engage the enemy. Decades after the war, in an interview with then-Pennsylvania state representative John D. Payne, Winters stated that the legal department for publisher Simon & Schuster was concerned that the allegations surrounding Speirs could lead to a lawsuit, leading Winters to directly confront him about the rumor. Winters went on to say that Speirs not only confirmed the allegation, but wrote a letter to that effect.

Although Speirs had enough points to go home after the end of the European Campaign, he chose to remain with Easy Company. Japan surrendered before Speirs and Easy could be transferred to the Pacific Theater.

He was awarded the Silver Star for his actions during the war, in particular in October 1944 in the aftermath of Operation Market Garden. The medal's citation read:

The President of the United States of America, authorized by Act of Congress July 9, 1918, takes pleasure in presenting the Silver Star to First Lieutenant (Infantry) Ronald C. Speirs (ASN: 0-439465), United States Army, for gallantry in action while serving with the 506th Parachute Infantry Regiment, 101st Airborne Division. On 10 October 1944, in the vicinity of Rendijk, Holland, he was assigned the mission of leading a patrol to the bank of the Neder Rijn River to determine enemy activity across the river. He reached the river bank with his patrol in the early hours of the morning and spent the entire day observing across the river. After dark he voluntarily swam across to the opposite bank alone where he found himself in unknown territory. He located an enemy machine gun nest, an enemy headquarters and other enemy activity near the town of Wageningen. He secured a rubber boat left by the enemy and returned to the friendly side of the river with this information. While returning to his own lines, he was wounded by fire from an enemy machine gun. Lieutenant Speirs was the first to cross the Neder Rijn River in this vicinity, and in so doing he paved the way for other patrols to make similar reconnaissances. The information proved of great value to his unit. His actions were in accordance with the highest standards of military service.

== Cold War ==
Speirs returned to the United States and decided to remain in the Army, serving in the Korean War. On 23 March 1951, he participated in Operation Tomahawk, in which he made a combat parachute jump into Munsan-ni with nearly 3,500 other troopers in his unit (187th Regimental Combat Team). As a rifle company commander, he was part of his battalion's mission to secure the drop zone; the battalion killed or wounded 40 to 50 enemy troops.

Following Korea, Speirs attended a Russian language course in 1956 and was assigned as a liaison officer to the Red Army in Potsdam, East Germany. In 1958, he became the American governor of the Spandau Prison in Berlin, where prominent Nazis such as Rudolf Hess were imprisoned.

In 1962, Speirs was a member of the U.S. Mission to the Royal Lao Army, where he served as a training officer in Mobile Training Team (MTT) for Operation White Star which was then managed by the Military Assistance Advisory Group in Laos (MAAG Laos).

His final assignment in the Army was as a plans officer in the Pentagon. He retired as a lieutenant colonel in 1964. For his service from 1961 to 1964, he was awarded the Legion of Merit, with the citation reading:

The President of the United States of America, authorized by Act of Congress, 20 July 1942, takes pleasure in presenting the Legion of Merit to Lieutenant Colonel (Infantry) Ronald C. Speirs, United States Army, for exceptionally meritorious conduct in the performance of outstanding services to the Government of the United States from October 1961 to March 1964.

== Personal life ==
On 20 May 1944, Speirs married Margaret Griffiths, whom he had met while stationed in Wiltshire, England. Griffiths had been a member of the Auxiliary Territorial Service. They had one son, Robert, who grew up to become a lieutenant colonel in the Royal Green Jackets.

The 1992 Stephen E. Ambrose book Band of Brothers claimed Speirs' English wife had left him and returned to her first husband, whom she had believed died during the war. Speirs denied this claim. In a 1992 letter to Winters, Speirs wrote that his first wife simply did not want to move to America with him and be away from her family in England. He also stated his wife was never a widow to begin with and that he had always loved her.

On 11 April 2007, Speirs died suddenly in St. Marie, Montana, where he was living.

== In popular culture ==
In the television miniseries Band of Brothers, he was portrayed by Matthew Settle.

== Bibliography ==
- Frederick, Jared; Dorr, Erik (2020). Fierce Valor: The True Story of Ronald Speirs and His Band of Brothers. Regnery Publishing. ISBN 978-1684511990.
