= Robert Wynn (United States Army soldier) =

American military personnel (1921–2000)

Robert Emory Wynn Jr.
- Born: July 10, 1921; South Hill, Virginia, United States
- Died: March 18, 2000 (aged 78); Chester, Virginia, United States
- Military career
- Allegiance: United States
- Branch: United States Army
- Service years: 1942–1945
- Rank: Sergeant
- Nickname: Popeye
- Units: Easy Company, 2nd Battalion, 506th Parachute Infantry Regiment, 101st Airborne Division
- Conflicts: World War II: Battle of Normandy; Operation Market Garden; Battle of the Bulge

Robert Emory "Popeye" Wynn Jr. (July 10, 1921 – March 18, 2000) was a non-commissioned officer with Easy Company, 2nd Battalion, 506th Parachute Infantry Regiment, in the 101st Airborne Division of the United States Army during World War II. Wynn was one of the 140 men of Easy Company. Wynn was portrayed by actor Nicholas Aaron in the HBO miniseries Band of Brothers.

== Youth ==
Robert Wynn was born on July 10, 1921. He was from South Hill, Virginia, in Mecklenburg County. In 1941, Wynn attended a machinist course at a vocational school in Norfolk. There he befriended Darrell "Shifty" Powers.

After the attack on Pearl Harbor, Wynn and Powers along with others in the vocational school were shipped to Navy Shipyard at Portsmouth to work on the battleships. Right before they were about to be frozen to the job, Wynn and Powers enlisted in the army and volunteered for the paratroopers. They understood that the training would be difficult, so they vowed they would make it to the end, and they made a bet that if either of them quit, that person would have to pay the other ten dollars. Therefore, later when asked by Lieutenant Richard Winters what got him into the paratroopers, Wynn answered, "Shifty did."

== Military service ==
Both Wynn and Powers were assigned to Easy Company at Camp Toccoa and received training under Captain Herbert Sobel. Wynn was made Sobel's runner in Camp Mackall. One night when Wynn was sent out to locate the platoons, he managed to get 'lost' and spent the night sleeping. Wynn explained to Sobel that he got lost because he could not see in the dark. He was replaced by Edward Tipper, who managed to offer further 'assistance' to Sobel.

Wynn made his first combat jump into Normandy on D-Day. He linked up with other members of E Company. He participated in the Brécourt Manor Assault. When the group was attacking the first gun, Wynn was shot in the buttocks and fell into the trench. Wynn apologized to Winters, who was leading the attack, "I'm sorry, Lieutenant, I goofed. I goofed. I'm sorry." Later Winters in his biography Beyond the Band of Brothers wrote, "My God, it's beautiful when you think of a guy who was so dedicated to his company that he apologized for getting hit. Now here was a soldier – hit by enemy fire in Normandy on D-Day, behind the German lines, and he is more upset that he had let his buddies down than he was concerned with his own injury. Popeye's actions spoke for all of us". Carwood Lipton and Mike Ranney found Wynn on his way back to safe area, and they helped to apply sulfa on his wound. Wynn was then evacuated to Utah Beach, and was sent to a field hospital in England.

In the hospital, Wynn was informed that if he stayed out of action for ninety days, he would be sent to another unit in the 101st Airborne. He persuaded a sergeant to send him back to Aldbourne with light duty papers and rejoined Easy on September 1, 1944. He threw away the papers when Easy was alerted for Operation Market Garden and fought with the company throughout the Holland campaign.

Wynn also participated in the Battle of the Bulge in Bastogne where he shared a foxhole with Powers.

During the fight in Haguenau, Wynn was chosen for a patrol mission across the Moder River led by Sergeant Ken Mercier. While the men were crossing the river, Wynn fell into the water. Wynn could not swim and he started screaming. Clancy Lyall, fellow Easy Company soldier, later said: "I think he must have woken up all the Germans with all his screaming!" Wynn survived, and would fight with Easy Company until the end of the war.

== Later years ==
After the war, Wynn became a structural ironworker on buildings and bridges.

He bought an old log cabin in Kitty Hawk, North Carolina and spent his last days with his family. Popeye lived in South Chester, Virginia until he died at 79 years.

Wynn died on March 18, 2000, just over a year before the Band of Brothers miniseries was first aired.

== Bibliography ==
- Brotherton, Marcus (2011). Shifty's War: The Authorized Biography of Sergeant Darrell 'Shifty' Powers, the Legendary Sharpshooter from the Band of Brothers. Berkley Caliber. ISBN 978-0-425-24097-7.
- Ambrose, Stephen E. (1992). Band of Brothers: Easy Company, 506th Regiment, 101st Airborne from Normandy to Hitler's Eagle's Nest. Simon & Schuster. ISBN 978-0-7434-6411-6.
- Ooms, Ronald (2013). Silver Eagle: The Official Biography of Band of Brothers Veteran Clancy Lyall. Dartford, Kent: Pneuma Springs Publishing. ISBN 978-1-78228-264-8.
- Winters, Dick; Kingseed, Cole C. (2011). Beyond Band of Brothers: The War Memoirs of Major Dick Winters. London: Ebury. ISBN 978-0-09194-158-1.
- Alexander, Larry (2005). Biggest Brother: The Life of Major Dick Winters, The Man Who Led the Band of Brothers. NAL Hardcover. ISBN 978-0-451-21510-9.
