= Brécourt Manor assault =

US parachute assault of the Normandy Invasion

Brécourt Manor Assault
- Part of the American airborne landings in Normandy
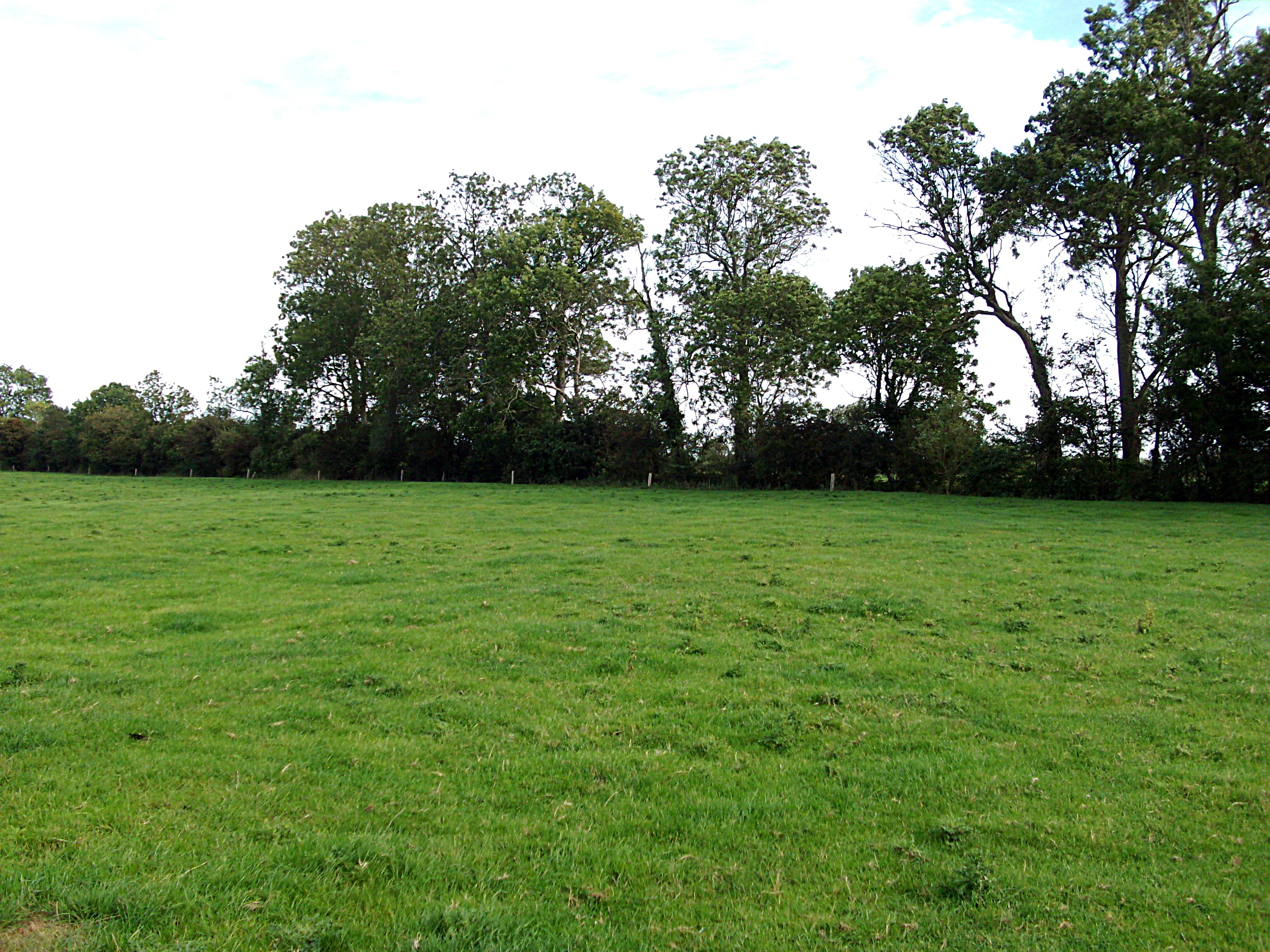
- Brécourt Manor in 2010.
Date	6 June 1944
Location	49°23′24.2″N 1°13′34.0″W; Le Grand Chemin, France
Result	Allied victory

Belligerents
United States	Germany

Commanders and leaders
(United States) Richard Winters (United States) Lynn Compton (United States) Ronald Speirs	(Nazi Germany) Friedrich August Freiherr von der Heydte (Not directly involved)

Units involved
Elements of the 101st Airborne Division	Unidentified German unit No. 6 Battery, Gebirgs-Artillerie-Regiment 191

Strength
23 paratroopers (Note: 12 paratroopers of Easy Company, 9 paratroopers of Dog Company, 1 paratrooper of Able Company, and 1 paratrooper from Fox Company.)	60 soldiers 4 machine guns

Casualties and losses
4 killed 2 wounded	20 killed 12 captured 4 howitzers disabled

The Brécourt Manor Assault (6 June 1944) during the US parachute assault of the Normandy Invasion of World War II is often cited as a classic example of small-unit tactics and leadership in overcoming a larger enemy force.

== Objective ==
Command of Company E, 2nd Battalion, 506th Parachute Infantry Regiment of the 101st Airborne Division had temporarily fallen to its executive officer, First Lieutenant Richard Winters. After linking up with his parent unit at the hamlet of Le Grand Chemin on the morning of 6 June 1944, Winters was ordered away from his company. With minimal instructions of "There's fire along that hedgerow there. Take care of it," and no briefing, Winters found himself given the task of destroying a German artillery battery.

The battery, initially reported to have been 10.5 cm leFH 18 howitzers, was firing onto causeway exit #2 leading off Utah Beach, disrupting landing forces of the US 4th Infantry Division. It was located at Brécourt Manor, 5 kilometres (3 mi) southwest of Utah Beach and north of the village of Sainte-Marie-du-Mont. Earlier in the morning, several other units had stumbled onto the position and been repulsed.

Winters undertook a reconnaissance at about 8:30 a.m., after which he collected a team of twelve men from his own and other companies. He knew the general location of the gun emplacements south of Le Grand Chemin, but had no information about the other side of the hedgerow. Winters' team attacked and discovered No. 6 Battery of (Gebirgs-) Artillerie-Regiment 191, consisting of four 105 mm howitzers defended by a company of soldiers. (Note: The artillery battalions of the 91st Luftlandedivision were equipped with a mountain howitzer, the 10.5 cm Gebirgshaubitze 40, whose ammunition was not interchangeable with that of the standard 105mm field howitzer, and which had one unit of fire ("basic load") available on D-Day.)

Winters believed that the unit was part of the 6th Fallschirmjägerregiment ("6th Parachute Ranger Regiment") with emplaced MG 42 machine guns. The 1st battalion of the 6th had been ordered to Sainte Marie-du-Mont from Carentan during the afternoon but arrived after dark. The 1st Company 919th Grenadier Regiment (709th Infantry Division) was posted at Sainte Marie-du-Mont and was responsible for the area. Elements of 1058th Grenadier Regiment (91st Luftlandedivision) were defending throughout the vicinity, (Note: A company of III./1058 defended Pouppeville, the town a mile away astride beach exit #1) and the artillery was part of this division also. The 795th Georgian Battalion, attached to the 709th ID, was to the northwest at Turqueville but is less likely to have been present because of terrain difficulties. Whichever unit defended the battery, the US paratroopers were opposed by about 60 German soldiers.

The crew originally assigned to the four 105 mm guns had apparently deserted during the night of the airborne landings. Oberstleutnant Friedrich von der Heydte of the German 6th Parachute Regiment, who was observing the landings at Utah Beach, learned that they had been abandoned, and traveled to Carentan, where he ordered his 1st Battalion to occupy and hold Sainte-Marie-du-Mont and Brécourt, and find men to work on the artillery battery.

== Battle ==
Upon arrival at the battery location, Winters made his plan; he positioned a pair of M1919 machine guns for covering fire and sent several soldiers (2nd Lt. Lynn D. Compton, Pvt. Donald Malarkey, and Sgt. William J. Guarnere) to one flank to destroy a machine gun position with grenades and provide covering fire.

While the trenches around the fields which connected the artillery positions provided the Germans with an easy way to supply and reinforce the guns, they also proved to be their biggest weakness. After destroying the first gun position, Winters and the rest of his team used the trenches as covered approaches to attack the remaining guns in turn. Each gun was destroyed by placing a block of TNT down its barrel and using German stick grenades to set off the charges.

Reinforcements from Company D, led by 2nd Lt. Ronald C. Speirs, arrived to complete the assault on the fourth and last gun. Speirs had a reputation as an excellent and extremely aggressive officer, and he led his men against the last gun position by running outside the trenches, exposing himself to enemy fire.

After the four guns were disabled, Winters' team came under heavy machine-gun fire from Brécourt Manor and withdrew. In one gun position he had discovered a German map marked with the locations of all German artillery and machine guns in that area of the Cotentin Peninsula. This was an invaluable piece of intelligence, and once Winters returned to Le Grand Chemin, he gave it to the 2nd Battalion intelligence officer (S-2) (Lewis Nixon), who passed the information up the chain of command. Command was so thrilled it sent the first two tanks to reach Utah Beach to support the paratroopers. Winters directed their fire to eliminate remaining German resistance.

Winters lost one man, Pfc. John D. Halls (of A Company) from an 81 mm mortar platoon. (Note: In Biggest Brother: The Life of Major Dick Winters, The Man Who Led the Band of Brothers, the biography written by Larry Alexander, Winters remembers the man as John D. Hall of A Company, whom he had coached on the regimental basketball team as the HBO series indicates.) Another, Private Robert "Popeye" Wynn, was wounded during the attack. (Note: Wynn was evacuated back to England, recovered from his wound and rejoined Easy Company just before Operation Market Garden.) Another casualty was Warrant Officer Andrew Hill, who was killed when he came upon the battle while searching for the headquarters of the 506th PIR. Also killed were Sgt. Julius "Rusty" Houck from F Company, who was with Speirs, and one soldier from D Company under Speirs' command. Another soldier from D Company was wounded.

== Aftermath ==
Troops landing at Utah Beach had a relatively easy landing, due in part to this successful assault. Colonel Robert Sink, the commander of the 506th PIR, recommended Winters for the Medal of Honor, but the award was downgraded to the Distinguished Service Cross because there was a policy of awarding only one Medal of Honor per division; in the 101st's case, to Lieutenant Colonel Robert G. Cole. There was later a campaign to upgrade Winters' Distinguished Service Cross to the Medal of Honor, but a bill to do so, H.R. 796, died in committee at the end of the 110th United States Congress. It was not reintroduced by its sponsor, Tim Holden.

The official Army history of these events on D-Day is quiet about the battle. Army historian S. L. A. Marshall interviewed Winters about the attack, but the interview was not private – many of Winters' superior officers were present – and, according to his memoir Beyond Band of Brothers, he may have downplayed his description of the event to avoid personal accolade and to keep the account succinct. In fact, Marshall stated in his report that Winters had about 200 men under his command. However, nearly every man involved was later recognized for his role in the attack.

A documentary film produced by filmmaker and trial attorney Vance Day, The Battle at Brecourt Manor, was premiered in August 2010 in Salem, Oregon, during an event for Donald Malarkey who served in Easy Company and during the engagement at Brecourt Manor. Day and Malarkey traveled extensively to conduct Frontline Leadership seminars around the country, primarily for law enforcement, military, and leadership organizations. Lynn "Buck" Compton also was regularly involved in both events for Frontline Leadership and "The Battle at Brecourt Manor" showings.

== Medals awarded ==
Distinguished Service Cross

- First Lieutenant (later Major) Richard Winters

Silver Star

- Second Lieutenant (later First Lieutenant) Lynn "Buck" Compton
- Sergeant (later Staff Sergeant) William "Wild Bill" Guarnere
- Private First Class (later Technician Fifth Class) Gerald Loraine

Bronze Star

- Sergeant (later First Lieutenant) Carwood Lipton
- Private (later Sergeant) Robert "Popeye" Wynn (WIA)
- Private Cleveland Petty
- Private (later Sergeant) Walter Hendrix
- Private (later Technical Sergeant) Donald Malarkey
- Private (later Sergeant) Myron N. Ranney
- Private (later Technician Fifth Class) Joseph Liebgott
- Private John Plesha
- Corporal (later Staff Sergeant) Joe Toye
- Private First Class John D. Hall (KIA)
- Sergeant Julius "Rusty" Houck (KIA)

Purple Heart

- Private (later Sergeant) Robert "Popeye" Wynn (WIA)
- Private First Class John D. Hall (KIA)
- Sergeant Julius "Rusty" Houck (KIA)

== In popular culture ==
The assault of Brécourt Manor is depicted in detail in the second episode of the 2001 war drama miniseries Band of Brothers ("Day of Days"), where it is the focus of the second half of the episode.

The assault of Brécourt Manor is the focus of the sixth mission (in the American Campaign) of the 2003 first-person video game Call of Duty.

The Brécourt Battery is featured as a strongpoint on the St. Marie du Mont map of the military simulation video game Hell Let Loose. It is located to the northwest on a 1:1 scale representation of the town of St. Marie du Mont and its surrounding countryside.
