= We Who Are Alive and Remain =

Military Non-fiction book by Marcus Brotherton

- Author: Marcus Brotherton
- Publisher: Penguin, Berkley-Caliber
- Publication date: 2009

We Who Are Alive and Remain: Untold Stories from the Band of Brothers is a military non-fiction book published in 2009 by Penguin/Berkley-Caliber publishers. Journalist Marcus Brotherton is credited with the book's authorship. Brotherton also co-wrote Call of Duty with Lt. Lynn "Buck" Compton.

The book lists 20 main contributors all of whom were members of Easy Company, 506th PIR, 101st Airborne, the company of soldiers that has come to be known as the original Band of Brothers. The company's nickname, Band of Brothers, was taken from the 1992 book of the same name authored by historian Stephen Ambrose that was later turned into an award-winning HBO miniseries by Tom Hanks and Steven Spielberg in 2001.

The 20 contributors were all alive when the book was released in May 2009, except Norman Neitzke, who died December 8, 2008, at age 82, while the book was in the final stages of production.

The title of the book comes from 1 Thessalonians 4:17: "Then we who are alive and remain shall be caught up together with them in the clouds to meet the Lord in the air."

== Contributors ==
- Roderick Bain
- Don Bond
- Roy Gates
- Ed Joint
- Joseph Lesniewski
- Al Mampre
- Earl McClung
- Norman Neitzke
- Ed "Doc" Pepping
- Frank Perconte
- Darrell "Shifty" Powers
- Frank J. Soboleski
- Herb Suerth, Jr. (president of the Men of Easy Company Association at the time of publication)
- Amos "Buck" Taylor
- Ed Tipper
- Bill Wingett
- Hank Zimmerman

The book traces the life stories of the contributors through basic training and World War II. Major campaigns of Easy Company include the Normandy Campaign, Operation Market Garden in the Netherlands, the Siege of Bastogne, Hagenau, Ruhr/ Germany, and occupation duties in Austria.

Three essays are provided at the back of the book in appendix form. The essays, titled Memories of my father, are from adult-children of deceased members of Easy Company. Mike Sobel talks about his father, Herbert Sobel. C. Susan Finn talks about her father, Robert Burr Smith, and George Luz Jr. and Lana Luz Miller (brother and sister) talk about their father, George Luz Sr.

The book made the New York Times Extended Bestseller list for Hardcover Nonfiction the sales week of June 28, 2009. The following week it climbed from #34 to #28. In July 2009 the book reached #10 on the New York Times Bestseller list for Political books.
