= Band of Brothers (book) =

1992 book written by Stephen E. Ambrose

- First edition
- Author: Stephen E. Ambrose
- Language: English
- Subject: Military history
- Genre: Historical anecdote novel Roman
- Publisher: Touchstone (Simon & Schuster)
- Publication date: 1992
- Publication place: United States
- Media type: Print (hardcover and paperback), ebook, audiobook
- Pages: 336
- ISBN: 978-0743224543

Band of Brothers, subtitled, E Company, 506th Regiment, 101st Airborne: From Normandy to Hitler's Eagle's Nest, by Stephen E. Ambrose, is an examination of a parachute infantry company in the 101st Airborne Division in the European Theater during World War II. While the book treats on the flow of battle, it concentrates on the lives of the soldiers in and associated with the company. The book was later adapted into a 2001 miniseries for HBO by Tom Hanks, Erik Jendreson, and Steven Spielberg, also titled Band of Brothers.

== Background ==
The book rests upon interviews Ambrose conducted with former members of E Company, 2nd Battalion, 506th Parachute Infantry Regiment of the 101st Airborne Division. The veterans were having a reunion at a hotel in New Orleans, Louisiana; the interviews were conducted as part of a project to collect oral histories of D-Day for the National D-Day Museum in New Orleans. Ambrose was intrigued with the bonds that had developed among the members of Easy Company. He circulated his drafts among the surviving members of the company, asked for input, and incorporated their ideas into later drafts. Ambrose wrote of the finished product, "We have come as close to the true story of Easy Company as possible."

== Notable people ==
- Lynn "Buck" Compton
- William "Wild Bill" Guarnere
- C. Carwood Lipton
- Don Malarkey
- Salve H. Matheson
- Warren Muck
- Lewis Nixon
- Darrell Cecil "Shifty" Powers
- Eugene "Doc" Roe
- Robert Sink
- Herbert Sobel
- Ronald Speirs
- Ed Tipper
- David Webster
- Richard D. Winters
- Robert "Popeye" Wynn

== Contents ==
The book consists of a foreword, epigraph, and maps section, followed by 19 chapters. There is an afterword and a brief author's bio after the chapters.

After the table of contents, the book's dedication reads:

To all those members of the Parachute Infantry
United States Army, 1941-1945
who wear the Purple Heart not as a decoration
but as a badge of office.

The epigraph is a quotation from Shakespeare's Henry V, from which the title of the book is derived:

From this day to the ending of the World,
...we in it shall be remembered ...we few, we happy few,
...we band of brothers.

== Controversy ==
Chapter Eighteen states Easy reached Berchtesgaden first amongst Allied units. Other units claim the honor, for example, on May 4 by forward elements of the 7th Infantry Regiment of the 3rd Infantry Division. (Note: According to Dwight D. Eisenhower, Supreme Commander of Allied forces in Europe, the 3rd Infantry Division was the first to take the town of Berchtesgaden; the "Eagle's Nest" is never mentioned. This view is supported by General Maxwell D. Taylor, former Commanding General of the 101st Airborne Division, then attached to the XXI Corps.) Reputedly members of the 7th went as far as the elevator to the Kehlsteinhaus, with at least one individual claiming he and a partner continued on to the top. Herman Louis Finnell of the 3rd Division, 7th Regiment, Company I, states that he and his ammo carrier, Pfc. Fungerburg, were the first to enter the Eagle's Nest, as well as the secret passages below the structure. Finnell stated that the hallway below the structure had rooms on either side filled with destroyed paintings, evening gowns, destroyed medical equipment and a wine cellar. (Note: Unlike Hitler's Berghof, the Kehlsteinhaus was not bombed; purportedly SS troops which survived the air raid inflicted substantial destruction on the Berghof, Kehlsteinhaus, and elsewhere before leaving the area in advance of Allied occupation. It remains unclear who inflicted the destruction that Pfc. Fungerburg describes, the SS, or prior U.S. troops.) However, the 101st Airborne maintains it was first both to Berchtesgaden and the Kehlsteinhaus. Elements of the French 2nd Armored Division, Laurent Touyeras, Georges Buis and Paul Répiton-Préneuf, were present on the night of May 4 to 5, and took several photographs before leaving on May 10 at the request of US command, and this is supported by testimonies of the Spanish soldiers who went along with them.
