= Frederick Heyliger =

United States Army officer (1916–2001)

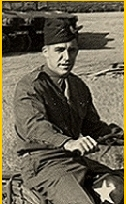
- Born: June 23, 1916; Acton, Massachusetts, US
- Died: November 3, 2001 (aged 85); Concord, Massachusetts, US
- Burial place: Sleepy Hollow Cemetery
- Spouse(s): Mary, Evelyn
- Military career
- Allegiance: United States
- Branch: United States Army
- Service years: 1940–1947
- Rank: Captain
- Nickname: Moose
- Units: E Company, 2nd Battalion, 506th Parachute Infantry Regiment, 101st Airborne Division
- Conflicts: World War II: Battle of Normandy; Operation Market Garden
- Awards: Military Cross (United Kingdom)

Frederick Theodore "Moose" Heyliger (23 June 1916 – 3 November 2001) was an American military officer who served with Easy Company, 2nd Battalion, 506th Parachute Infantry Regiment in the 101st Airborne Division of the United States Army during World War II. He took part in D-Day and Operation Market Garden, before being discharged due to injury sustained from friendly fire.

In the HBO miniseries Band of Brothers, Heyliger was portrayed by Scottish actor Stephen McCole.

== Early life ==
Heyliger was born in Concord, Middlesex County, Massachusetts. Heyliger worked as a farm hand throughout his youth and graduated from the Lawrence Academy at Groton in 1937. Heyliger completed three years of college.

== Military service ==
Heyliger was assigned to the 506th's Easy Company before the paratrooper division left the United States; he was later assigned as mortar platoon leader for 2nd Battalion's Headquarters Company. After Richard Winters was assigned as executive officer of 2nd Battalion, First Lieutenant Heyliger took command of Easy Company from Winters' first replacement.

Heyliger commanded Easy Company during Operation Pegasus on October 23, 1944. After the failure of Operation Market Garden, he oversaw the rescue and evacuation of 138 British 1st Airborne Division troops stranded in German-held territory, for which he received the British Military Cross.

On October 31, 1944, he was accidentally shot by one of his own men while on patrol and talking with Richard Winters about commanding Easy Company. He underwent skin and nerve grafts before being discharged in February 1947.

== Later years and death ==
After Heyliger returned home to Massachusetts, he enrolled at the University of Massachusetts and graduated in 1950 with a degree in ornamental horticulture. Heyliger died at the age of 85 on November 3, 2001, one day before the 10th and final episode of Band of Brothers ("Points") premiered on HBO. He is buried in Sleepy Hollow Cemetery in Concord, Massachusetts.
