= Call of Duty (disambiguation) =

Call of Duty is a first-person shooter video game series franchise.

Call of Duty may also refer to:

- Call of Duty (video game), the first video game in the series
- Call of Duty (book), the memoirs of Lynn Compton
- The Call of Duty (comics), a series of short-lived Marvel Comics
- Commandos: Beyond the Call of Duty, expansion pack of Commandos: Behind Enemy Lines
- "Call of Duty", a song by DaBaby from Baby on Baby 2, 2022
