= Robert B. Brewer =

United States Army officer in World War II

Robert Burnham Brewer
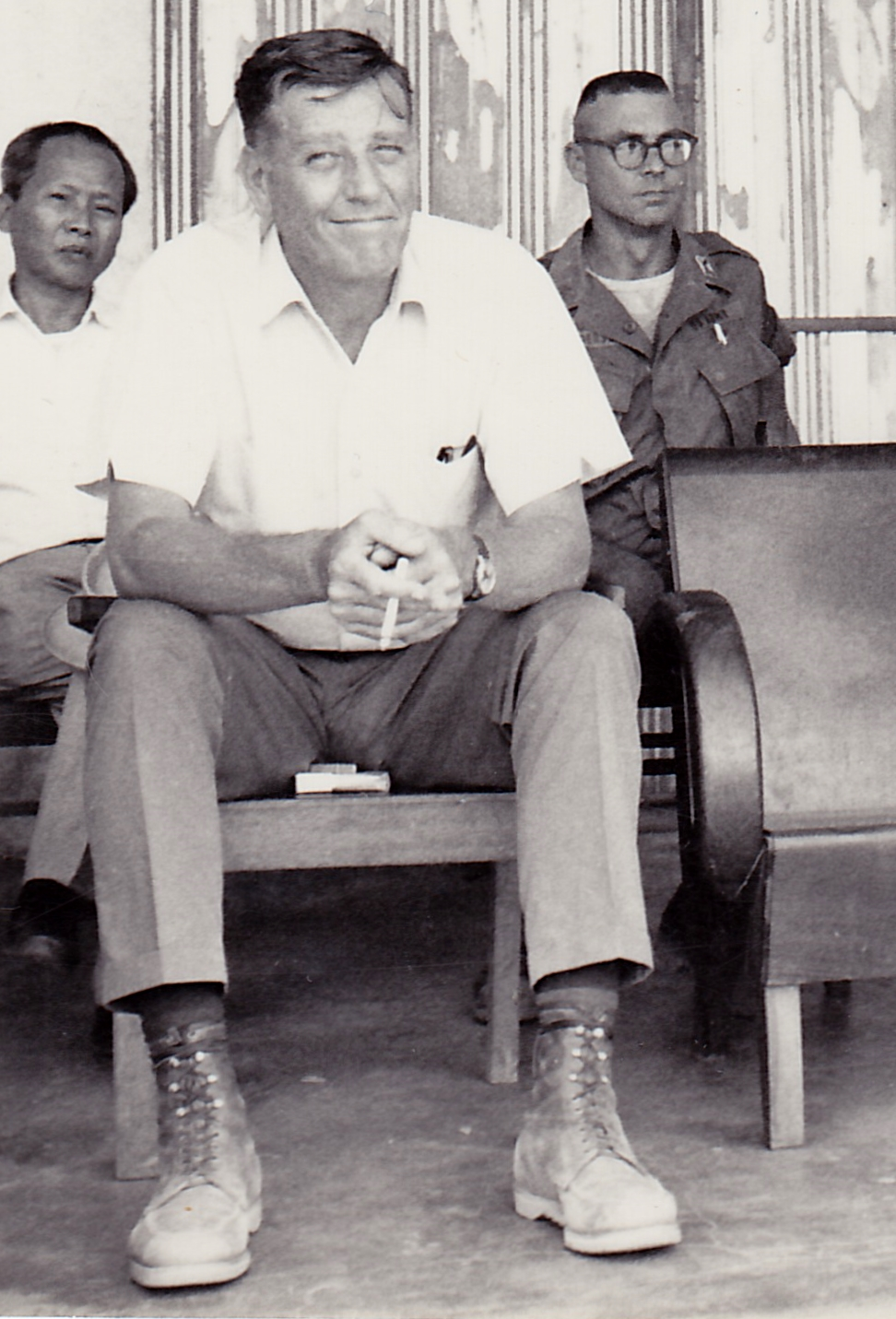
- Brewer at ceremony in Quảng Trị during the Vietnam War
- Born: 31 January 1924; Fresno, California, U.S.
- Died: 5 December 1996 (aged 72)
- Relatives: Wheaton Brewer (father); Elizabeth Brewer (sister)
- Military career
- Allegiance: United States
- Branch: United States Army
- Service years: 1942–1973
- Rank: Colonel
- Units: E Company, 2nd Battalion, 506th Parachute Infantry Regiment, 101st Airborne Division
- Conflicts: World War II: Operation Overlord; Operation Market Garden; Vietnam War

Robert Burnham "Bob" Brewer (31 January 1924 – 5 December 1996) was a United States Army officer during World War II, assigned to E Company, 2nd Battalion, 506th Parachute Infantry Regiment, 101st Airborne Division. Brewer was portrayed, without credit by Canadian actor Brandon Firla, in one episode of the HBO miniseries Band of Brothers.

== Early life ==
Robert Burnham Brewer was born on 31 January 1924 in Fresno, California.

== Career ==
Brewer was a Boy Scout. As a student at the Harvard School in Los Angeles, Brewer excelled in sports and enrolled in ROTC training. In 1942, he was commissioned as a second lieutenant in the U.S. Army and volunteered for duty with the newly forming airborne divisions. He was assigned to the 101st Airborne Division. Brewer was the assistant Platoon Leader of the Second Battalion's 81mm mortar platoon when he parachuted into Normandy on D-Day. Following the Division's return for rest and refitting in England, he was reassigned to the 1st Platoon, E Company, 2nd Battalion as assistant platoon leader.

Brewer was seriously wounded during Operation Market Garden while taking point with the platoon's scouts, as E Company was advancing into Eindhoven. He was a tall officer and stood out from the other men. Winters sent orders for him to pull back, but he was shot by a sniper before he heard the orders. The round hit him in the throat below the jawline, knocking him down. Some of his men ran to his assistance but concluded he was too seriously wounded to survive, and left him to be cared for by the platoon medics. He and medic Albert Mampre, who was shot while helping him, were eventually helped by local farmer, who stenched the flow of blood and dressed Brewer's wound. They were eventually evacuated to an aid station. Brewer rejoined E Company at the end of the war after he had recovered.

Following his release from service at the end of the war, Brewer returned to California, married his high school sweetheart, Ruth Bradfield, and enrolled in pre-med courses at the University of California, Berkeley. At the end of his first year, he decided to accept an offer to rejoin the Army, this time as an officer with the Office of Strategic Services (OSS), forerunner to the Central Intelligence Agency (CIA). During training with the CIA, he ran into Amos Taylor, who had joined the CIA after the war as well, and the two became close friends. After training, he and his family moved to Tokyo, where he ran intelligence missions in Korea. After his stint in the Far East, he was reassigned to Fort Knox, Kentucky, and subsequently to Camp Peary, Virginia, where he trained soldiers in covert action.

In 1957, he was assigned to a two-year position at CIA headquarters in Langley, Virginia, then to Pakistan and the Philippines. In 1966 he was appointed Senior Province Advisor in Quảng Trị Province, in the Republic of Vietnam, the only CIA officer to hold such a post, where he served until the summer of 1968. In January 1968, during the Communist Tet Offensive, Brewer helped defeat a large assault on Quảng Trị City and nearby South Vietnamese military installations by the North Vietnamese People's Army of Vietnam (PAVN). The assault was intended to capture and hold the city and to gain control of the province, and along with the attempt to capture and hold the city of Huế, one province south of Quảng Trị Province, it was one of the North's primary goals in mounting its offensive. Following his service in Vietnam, Brewer spent a tour in Northern Thailand, helping the Thai government defeat a Communist insurgency, and aiding its efforts to eradicate opium production in the Golden Triangle area of Burma (Myanmar), Laos, and Thailand. He retired from government service in 1973.

== Later life and death ==
In retirement, Brewer and his family moved to La Cañada, California, to enroll his son in a preparatory school run by an old friend. He taught courses at the school and worked with Explorer Scouts. After his son graduated and entered college, Brewer and his wife moved to Reno, Nevada, close to a family-owned property where he had spent enjoyable summers as a boy.

On 5 December 1996, Brewer died in California of lung cancer, leaving his wife Ruth, and five children, Mary Elizabeth, Robert Burnham, Nathan Hale, Virginia Ruth, and Wheaton Hale Brewer.
