= Cole C. Kingseed =

American historian

Colonel Cole Christian Kingseed
- Born: August 27, 1949 (age 77)
- Education: University of Dayton; Ohio State University; Naval War College
- Occupations: Historian, author, professor, consultant
- Writing career
- Subjects: Military history, World War II
- Notable work: Beyond Band of Brothers: The War Memoirs of Major Dick Winters

Cole Christian Kingseed is an Army veteran, military historian, and professor. He is the author of Beyond Band of Brothers: The War Memoirs of Major Dick Winters. Kingseed, a 30-year army veteran, served as a Full Professor of History and Chief of Military History at the United States Military Academy at West Point.

== Education ==
Kingseed graduated from the University of Dayton (OH) in 1971 with his Bachelor of Arts degree. He later earned his Master's degree and Ph.D. in history from Ohio State University. He also holds a Master of Arts Degree in National Security and Strategic Studies from the US Naval War College.

== Career ==
Throughout his thirty-year career in the US Army, Kingseed served in various command and staff positions.

Kingseed was granted tenure at the US Military Academy at West Point as Professor Emeritus of History and Chief of Military History. He served as Chief of Military History for four years.

Kingseed has written more than fifty articles on leadership and 300 book reviews. He has also written and edited six books. He has appeared on the History Channel in documentaries for George S. Patton and Douglas MacArthur. Kingseed, who co-wrote the war memoirs of Major Dick Winters with Winters, organized a memorial service for him when he died.

In 2009, he was awarded the Army Historical Foundation's Distinguished Writing Award for his article on US Army leadership during World War II.

Currently, Kingseed is the founding partner and consulting historian for Battlefield Leadership. Kingseed is also the President of The Brecourt Leadership Experience, Inc., a leadership consulting firm. Its clients include General Electric, Freddie Mac, International Paper, and Bayer Corporation.

In May 2016, Kingseed was a commencement speaker at The Citadel and received an honorary Doctor of Letters degree.

== Personal life ==
Kingseed lives in Cornwall-on-Hudson, New York, with his family.

== Published work ==
Books

- Conversations with Major Dick Winters; ISBN 9780425271544
- Beyond Band of Brothers: The War Memoirs of Major Dick Winters; 2006; ISBN 9780425208137
- Old Glory Stories: American Combat Leadership in WWII; 2006; ISBN 978-1591144403
- From Omaha Beach to Dawson's Ridge; 2005; ISBN 978-1591144397
- The American Civil War; 2004; ISBN 978-0313316388
- Eisenhower and the Suez Crisis of 1956; 1995; ISBN 9780585283166
