= Herbert Sobel =

American commissioned officer and paratrooper

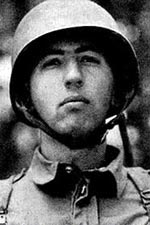
- Born: Herbert Maxwell Sobel; January 26, 1912; Chicago, Illinois, U.S.
- Died: September 30, 1987 (aged 75); Waukegan, Illinois, U.S.
- Military career
- Allegiance: United States
- Branch: Organized Reserve
- Rank: Lieutenant colonel
- Unit: E Company, 2nd Battalion, 506th PIR, 101st Airborne Division
- Conflicts: World War II

Herbert Maxwell Sobel (January 26, 1912 – September 30, 1987) was an American soldier who served as a commissioned officer with Easy Company, 2nd Battalion, 506th Parachute Infantry Regiment, in the 101st Airborne Division during World War II. Known as a tough, strict, and divisive training commander, Sobel was ultimately replaced as company commander prior to D-Day due to his perceived inadequacy leading soldiers in field combat exercises.

Sobel's story was featured in historian Stephen E. Ambrose's book Band of Brothers, and he was portrayed by David Schwimmer in the HBO miniseries of the same name.

== Early life and education ==
Sobel was born and raised in a Jewish family of four children in Chicago, Illinois. He attended high school at the Culver Military Academy in Indiana, where he was a member of the swim team, and later graduated from the University of Illinois, where he studied business.

== Military career ==
After university, Sobel was commissioned as an officer in the Organized Reserve. By 1937, he had been promoted to first lieutenant, and by July 1941, he had been ordered to active duty and assigned to Camp Grant near Rockford, Illinois.

In 1942, Sobel was assigned to Easy Company, 2nd Battalion, 506th Parachute Infantry Regiment as its initial member and commanding officer. Sobel commanded Easy Company during basic training at Camp Toccoa, Georgia, during which he was promoted to captain. Sobel was intensely disliked by the men under his command, who saw him as a petty, arbitrary, domineering tyrant who handed down cruel punishments for the most minuscule of infractions, real or imagined. "Until I landed in France in the very early hours of D-Day," recalled Corporal Walter Gordon, "my war was with [Sobel]." Lieutenant Richard Winters, Sobel's executive officer, took exception to Sobel's "desire to lead by fear rather than example." The officers in Easy Company nicknamed Sobel "the Black Swan," and the enlisted men frequently referred to him as a "fucking Jew" when he was out of earshot.

Despite his harsh tactics, Sobel proved effective in training an excellent company of highly disciplined paratroopers. However, by the time Easy Company had transferred to Camp Mackall, North Carolina, in February 1943, Sobel's shortcomings as a field commander became apparent. During exercises, his lack of spatial awareness, physicality, and smart decision making made his men concerned about his ability to lead them in battle. "I am going into combat with this man. He'll get us all killed," Winters recalled thinking. In 2009, Sergeant Amos "Buck" Taylor said:

Some of the men downright hated him even to the point where Sobel's life was in danger. As NCOs, we had all heard comments from other enlisted men such as, "Boy, if I ever get Sobel in my sights he's a goner"—stuff like that...there was a strong feeling among the men that Sobel couldn't be trusted in a combat situation...here's my conclusion: Captain Sobel was a good training officer, strict, he wanted his men to be the best. I admire him for that. But you could not trust his judgment in a battle situation.

The situation escalated while the regiment was stationed in Aldbourne, Wiltshire, England, in October 1943. Sobel initiated court-martial proceedings against Winters over Winters' failure to carry out conflicting latrine inspection orders Sobel had given him. This caused the sentiment against Sobel to finally boil over: "Sobel had authority over the men [but] Lieutenant Winters had their respect. They were bound to clash," Stephen E. Ambrose wrote in Band of Brothers. This conflict prompted all but three of the non-commissioned officers in Easy Company to attempt to resign their ranks in protest. As a result, Colonel Robert Sink, the regimental commander, set aside Winters' court-martial, and after furiously berating his NCOs for the attempted mutiny, replaced Sobel with Lieutenant Thomas Meehan as commander of Easy Company.

Sink subsequently assigned Sobel to command an airborne school in Chilton Foliat, Wiltshire, which would provide jump training for non-combat personnel in preparation for the invasion of France. By June 1944, Sobel and his staff had trained more than 400 men through the five practice jumps necessary to qualify as parachutists. On D-Day, Sobel parachuted into Normandy with the rest of the 101st Airborne Division as commander of the 506th's service company. Immediately after landing, Sobel assembled four men and destroyed a German machine gun nest with grenades before joining the rest of the division near Carentan.

Sobel spent the remainder of the war as a staff officer in the 506th, and was appointed the regiment's S-4 (logistics officer) on March 8, 1945. Sobel remained in the Army Reserve after the war, eventually retiring at the rank of lieutenant colonel.

== Later life and death ==
After his service in World War II, Sobel returned to Chicago, where he worked as a credit manager for a telephone equipment company. He married Rose, a former military nurse from South Dakota whose Catholicism was disapproved of by Sobel's Jewish family. They raised three sons, who attended church weekly with Rose before their parents' divorce.

In 1970, Sobel shot himself in the head with a small-caliber pistol in an attempted suicide. The bullet entered his left temple, severing his optic nerves and rendering him blind. Soon afterward, he began living at a Veterans Administration assisted-living facility in Waukegan, Illinois, where he died on September 30, 1987; the death certificate listed malnutrition as the cause of death. A private memorial service was held at Piser-Weinstein Menorah Chapel in Chicago.

== Legacy ==
Despite Sobel being almost universally disliked by the men under his command, many of them have nevertheless credited him with Easy Company's cohesion, some if for no other reason than Sobel united the men against a common enemy. Richard Winters wrote that Easy Company's teamwork and discipline "began with Captain Herbert Sobel at Camp Toccoa," and Sergeant Rod Strohl said that "Herbert Sobel made E Company." When referring to the large number of former Easy Company officers who eventually served at the 506th's regimental and battalion levels, Ambrose wrote that Sobel "must have been doing something right back in the summer of '42 at Toccoa."

Sobel is featured prominently in Stephen E. Ambrose's 1992 book Band of Brothers, a history of Easy Company. In the HBO miniseries of the same name, Sobel is portrayed by actor David Schwimmer.

In Marcus Brotherton's 2009 book We Who Are Alive and Remain: Untold Stories from the Band of Brothers, several Easy Company veterans offered differing views of how Sobel was portrayed in Band of Brothers. Ed Tipper praised Sobel's stamina, saying he could run Currahee "with the best of them," and Shifty Powers said, "He trained us well. Anything he'd ask you to do, he'd do it—I always admired that about him." Forrest Guth said that "In my estimation, Captain Sobel was good for us. He was tough and very much a disciplinarian. As far as I'm concerned, Sobel was the one who made E Company tough." Bill Wingett took exception to what he considered embellishments in the Band of Brothers miniseries that painted Sobel in a negative light, and Sobel's son Michael also criticized his father's harsh depiction.
