= Darrell Powers =

US Army non-commissioned officer (1923–2009)

Darrell Cecil Powers
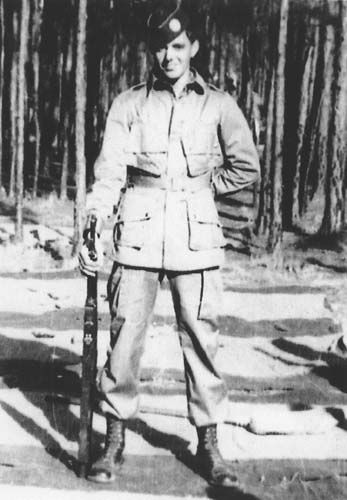
- Born: March 13, 1923; Clinchco, Virginia, US
- Died: June 17, 2009 (aged 86); Clinchco, Virginia, US
- Relatives: Dorothy Powers (wife)
- Military career
- Allegiance: United States
- Branch: United States Army
- Service years: 1942–1945
- Rank: Staff Sergeant
- Nickname: "Shifty"
- Units: E Company, 2nd Battalion, 506th Parachute Infantry Regiment, 101st Airborne Division
- Conflicts: World War II
- Other work: Machinist

Darrell Cecil "Shifty" Powers (13 March 1923 – 17 June 2009) was a non-commissioned officer with Easy Company, 2nd Battalion, 506th Parachute Infantry Regiment, in the 101st Airborne Division during World War II. Powers was portrayed in the HBO miniseries Band of Brothers by Peter Youngblood Hills.

== Early life ==
Powers was born in Clinchco, Virginia. His father was an excellent rifle and pistol shot and taught him how to shoot when he was young. Powers spent a great deal of time in the outdoors, hunting game. He got to the point where he could throw a coin in the air and hit it with a rifle. Such skills helped him as a soldier. His nickname "Shifty" originated from his basketball days from his ability to be 'shifty' on his feet.

After Powers graduated from high school, he took a machinist training course at a vocational school in Norfolk, Virginia. It was there he befriended Robert 'Popeye' Wynn. After completing the course, both went to work in the Norfolk Naval Shipyard. When they found out their work was going to be deemed critical to the American war effort, preventing them (even if they wanted to fight), from leaving for the duration of the war, the pair decided to join the US Army. Powers enlisted on 14 August 1942, at Richmond, Virginia.

== Military service ==
Powers followed Easy Company to station in Aldbourne, England. He was shocked to see that the residents there were prepared to defend themselves against the Germans with only garden implements. He thought it would have been a massacre if the Germans had indeed invaded Aldbourne.

Powers jumped into Normandy on D-Day. Missing his drop zone, he joined two others from the company and the three linked up with Easy Company several days later to fight in Carentan. Powers participated in the Allied military operation Operation Market Garden in the Netherlands.

Powers also fought in the Battle of the Bulge in Belgium. On 29 December 1944, when Easy Company was staying in the woods, Powers noticed a tree that was not there just the day before and reported it to First Sergeant Carwood Lipton. The "tree" was ultimately discovered to be part of the camouflage the Germans put up for their anti-aircraft battery. Lipton got approval for full battery fire to attack the area despite the short supply of artillery ammunition and the area was deserted within an hour. Lipton commented, "It all happened, because Shifty saw a tree almost a mile away that hadn't been there the day before." It was one of Powers' most remarkable achievements and a testament to the extraordinary gifts his backwoods upbringing brought to Easy Company.

On 13 January 1945, when Easy Company was attacking Foy, several of the men were pinned down by a sniper that nobody could locate. Suddenly, Powers yelled, "I see him!" and fired his rifle, killing the sniper. Later, when Carwood Lipton and Wynn found the sniper's corpse, they were shocked to see the bullet hole centered in the middle of his forehead. Wynn commented, "You know, it just doesn't pay to be shootin' at Shifty when he's got a rifle."

Powers was one of the very few who was never wounded in combat. It was for this reason that Powers lacked the sufficient points to return home under the military point system, although he was there every day when Easy Company fought on the line. Powers joined and won the lottery that was organized to allow one man from each company to return home early on a furlough. During the trip to the airfield, the vehicle that Shifty was in was involved in an accident and he was badly injured. He spent many months recuperating in hospitals overseas while his comrades in arms arrived home long before he did.

== Later years ==
Honorably discharged from the Army in the postwar demobilization, Powers became a machinist. He was married to his wife Dorothy for 60 years at the time of his death. He moved to California, got a machinist job there and stayed there for three years with his family. He was laid off when the company he worked for lost a government contract, so he returned home. He worked as a machinist for the Clinchfield Coal Corporation for more than twenty years.

Powers, in his later years, was in declining health and depressed. The Powers family noted the release of the Band of Brothers TV miniseries and the subsequent speaking engagements brought Powers out of the depression and speculated that the series bought Powers extra years of life.

Powers is listed as one of 20 men from Easy Company who contributed to the 2009 book We Who Are Alive and Remain: Untold Stories from the Band of Brothers, published by Penguin/Berkley-Caliber.

Powers died of lung cancer on 17 June 2009, in Dickenson County, Virginia. He is buried at Temple Hill Memorial Park, Castlewood, Russell County, Virginia.

== Band of Brothers ==
In the first edition of the book Band of Brothers, author Ambrose wrote that on 23 December 1944, Powers disobeyed a direct order from Lieutenant Edward Shames to go out on patrol because he was discouraged. Both Shames and Powers denied that had happened, with Powers calling the insinuation "a slap in the face." Upon request and verification, Ambrose deleted that story from the later edition of the book.

Powers was a character, played by Peter Youngblood Hills, in the HBO Band of Brothers TV miniseries. In the episode "The Last Patrol", Powers was shown to be one of the soldiers participating in the patrol mission; however, in reality, Powers was not on that patrol.

== Bibliography ==
- Ambrose, Stephen E. (1992). Band of Brothers: Easy Company, 506th Regiment, 101st Airborne from Normandy to Hitler's Eagle's Nest. Simon & Schuster. ISBN 978-0-7434-6411-6.
- Brotherton, Marcus (2009). We Who Are Alive and Remain: Untold Stories from The Band of Brothers. Berkley Caliber. ISBN 978-0-7434-6411-6.
- Brotherton, Marcus (2011). Shifty's War: The Authorized Biography of Sergeant Darrell 'Shifty' Powers, the Legendary Sharpshooter from the Band of Brothers. Berkley Caliber. ISBN 978-0-425-24097-7.
