= E Company, 506th Infantry Regiment =

506th Parachute Infantry Regiment of the 101st Airborne Division

E Company, 2nd Battalion, 506th Parachute Infantry Regiment, 101st Airborne Division
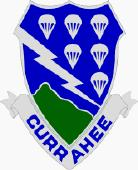
- The distinctive unit crest of the 506th Parachute Infantry Regiment
- Active: 1942–1945; 1954–1957
- Country: United States of America
- Branch: United States Army
- Type: Infantry company
- Role: Air Assault Forces
- Part of: 506th Parachute Infantry Regiment; 101st Airborne Division
- Nickname: "Easy Company"
- Motto: "Currahee" (We Stand Alone)
- March: Blood on the Risers
- Engagements: World War II: Operation Overlord; Operation Market Garden; Battle of the Bulge; Western Allied invasion of Germany

Commanders
- Colonel of the Regiment: Robert Sink
- Notable commanders: Frederick Heyliger; Herbert Sobel; Ronald Speirs; Richard Winters

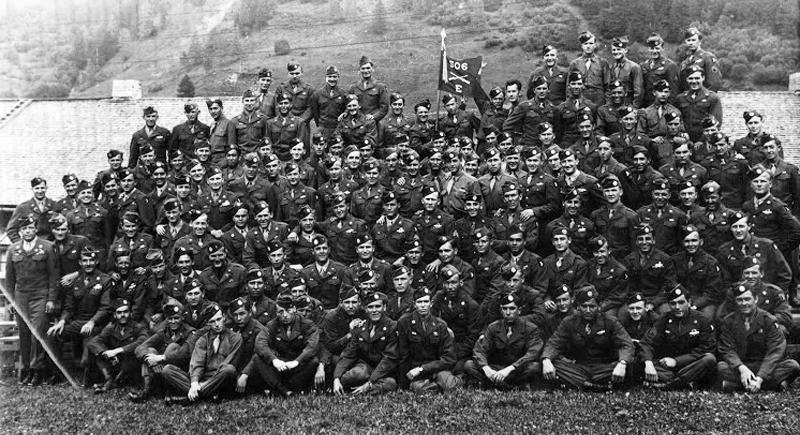
135 Paratroopers of Easy Company, 506th Infantry Regiment in Austria, after the end of World War II, 1945

E Company, 2nd Battalion of the 506th Parachute Infantry Regiment of the 101st Airborne Division, the "Screaming Eagles", is a company in the United States Army. The company was referred to as "Easy" after the radio call for "E" in the phonetic alphabet used during World War II. The experiences of its members during that war are the subject of the 1992 book Band of Brothers by historian Stephen Ambrose and the 2001 HBO miniseries of the same name.

== History ==
=== Training and composition ===
The 506th PIR was an experimental airborne regiment created in 1942 to jump from C-47 transport airplanes into hostile territory.

E Company was established at Camp Toccoa, Georgia, under the command of 1st Lieutenant Herbert Sobel. Before attending paratrooper training, the unit's troops performed the standard battle drills and physical training that comes with being in the parachute infantry. One of the exercises was running Currahee, a large, steep hill whose trail ran "three miles up, three miles down". The troops also performed formation runs in three four-column running groups, an innovation that was adopted by the Army in the 1960s.

Sobel, who was known for his extreme strictness, got the troops in such impeccable physical condition that they were able to skip the physical training portion of Jump School.

E Company's third-ever commander, 1st Lieutenant Richard Winters (originally a 2nd Lieutenant under Sobel, serving as platoon leader of E Company's 2nd Platoon; later a Major commanding the overall 2nd Battalion), said E Company originally "included three rifle platoons and a headquarters section. Each platoon contained three twelve-man rifle squads and a six-man mortar team squad. Easy also had one machine gun attached to each of its rifle squads, and a 60mm mortar in each mortar team."

=== Mutiny protesting Sobel's leadership ===
While waiting for the invasion of Normandy, Easy Company was located at Aldbourne, Wiltshire, England.

The tension that had been brewing between Winters and Sobel came to a head. For some time, Winters (then a 1st lieutenant) had privately held concerns over Sobel's ability to lead the company in combat. Many of the enlisted men in the company had come to respect Winters for his competence and had also developed their own concerns about Sobel's leadership. Winters later said that he never wanted to compete with Sobel for command of Easy Company; still, Sobel attempted to bring Winters up on trumped-up charges for "failure to carry out a lawful order". Feeling that his punishment was unjust, Winters requested that the charge be reviewed by court-martial. One day after Winters' punishment was set aside by battalion commander Major Robert L. Strayer, Sobel brought Winters up on another charge. During the investigation, Winters was transferred to the Headquarters Company and appointed as the battalion mess officer.

A number of the company's non-commissioned officers (NCOs) decided to give the regimental commander, Colonel Robert Sink, an ultimatum: replace Sobel, or they would surrender their stripes. Sink was not impressed. He demoted to private and transferred to other companies the two platoon sergeants who were considered to be the ringleaders: Terrence "Salty" Harris (sent to A Company, he would be killed by a sniper during the Battle of Carentan on 18 June 1944) and Myron Ranney, sent to I Company.

Still, Sink realized that something had to be done and decided to transfer Sobel out of Easy Company, giving him command of a new parachute training school at Chilton Foliat. Winters' court-martial was set aside and he returned to Easy Company as a lieutenant of 1st Platoon. Winters later said he felt that despite his differences with Sobel, at least part of Easy Company's success had been due to Sobel's strenuous training and high expectations.

In February 1944, First Lieutenant Thomas Meehan was given command of Easy Company.

Shortly after their transfer, Harris and Ranney joined the Pathfinders, which consisted of around 80 volunteers from every unit who would land first and guide the way for the main waves of the invasion. Being a Pathfinder was a difficult job, and it meant being out in front and facing the German army alone. Shortly before the invasion, Ranney wrote to Winters, pleading his case, and five days before the invasion, orders came in transferring Ranney back to Easy Company.

=== Operation Overlord (D-Day) ===
The Memorial plaque near RAF Upottery, Devon, UK, showing the names of those who died in transit from the base to France on 5 and 7 June 1944.

For Operation Overlord, E Company's mission was to capture the entrances to and clear any obstacles around "Causeway 2", a pre-selected route off Utah Beach for the Allied forces landing from the sea a few hours later.

The company departed from Upottery airbase in Devon, England, and dropped over the Cotentin Peninsula of Normandy, France, in the early hours of the morning of 6 June 1944. Easy Company flew in eight aircraft in Sticks #66-73, with about 17 paratroopers per stick.

==== Destruction of Stick 66 ====
Most of Easy Company's headquarters section was assigned to Stick #66, with Robert Burr Smith and Joseph "Red" Hogan assigned to other planes to save weight. The 17 members of Stick #66 included company commander Meehan and three of its most senior non-commissioned officers: First Sergeant Bill Evans, Staff Sergeant Murray Roberts (the Supply Sergeant) and Sergeant Elmer Murray (the Operations Sergeant). Sergeant Carwood Lipton recalled later that he had strategized various combat situations with Sergeant Murray while the rest of Easy Company went to the movies the day before the jump.

Plane #66 led a diamond formation that also included #67 to the left, #68 to the right, and #69 in the trailing position. Over France, the plane carrying Stick #66 was hit by anti-aircraft fire. The pilot did a 180-degree turn and turned the landing lights on as the plane lost altitude, but it hit a hedgerow and exploded, killing all aboard. The crash was witnessed by Ed Mauser of E Company's 2nd Platoon, who had leaped from plane #69 after it was hit by flak and the pilot turned on the green jump light. Mauser's neck was snapped back by his plane's prop blast and he faced backward as he floated downwards, giving him a view of plane #66.

==== Brécourt Manor assault ====
With Meehan missing (it was only discovered later that he had been killed), Richard Winters was the most senior officer in Easy Company and took command; it was his first assignment as the acting company commander. After assembling on the ground, the men of E Company, with the assistance of D Company, disabled a battery of four German heavy guns in the assault of Brécourt Manor on D-Day that threatened forces coming along Causeway 2.

==== Leadership changes ====
The loss of so many officers and NCOs on D-Day brought several changes to Easy Company. Technically, Lieutenant Raymond Schmitz, 2nd Platoon Leader, was still with Easy Company but was injured the day before D-Day after demanding Richard Winters wrestle him, and was replaced by Buck Compton.

Position	D-Day incumbent	New leader	Market Garden	Bastogne	Haguenau
Commanding Officer	1st Lt. Thomas Meehan	1st Lt. Richard Winters	Capt. Richard Winters/1st Lt. Fredrick Heyliger	1st Lt. Norman Dike Jr	1st Lt. Ronald Speirs
Executive Officer	Vacant	Vacant	1st Lt. Harry Welsh		
1st Platoon Leader	1st Lt. Richard Winters	2nd Lt. Harry Welsh	1st Lt. Thomas Peacock	1st Lt. Thomas Peacock/1st Lt. Jack Foley	1st Lt. Jack Foley
2nd Platoon Leader	2nd Lt. Warren Roush	2nd Lt. Buck Compton	1st Lt. Buck Compton		T/Sgt. Donald Malarkey (acting)
3rd Platoon Leader	2nd Lt. Robert Mathews	2nd Lt. Warren Roush	2nd Lt. Edward Shames	2nd Lt. Edward Shames	2nd Lt. Edward Shames
1st Platoon Assistant	2nd Lt. Harry Welsh	Vacant	2nd Lt. Robert Brewer	2nd Lt. Jack Foley	
2nd Platoon Assistant	2nd Lt. Buck Compton	Vacant			2nd Lt. Henry Jones
3rd Platoon Assistant	S/Sgt. C. Carwood Lipton (acting)	2nd Lt. Francis O’Brien			
First Sergeant	1/Sgt. William Evans	S/Sgt. James Diel (acting)		1/Sgt. C. Carwood Lipton	1/Sgt. C. Carwood Lipton
1st Platoon Sergeant	S/Sgt. Leo Boyle	S/Sgt. Leo Boyle	S/Sgt. Floyd Talbert		
2nd Platoon Sergeant	S/Sgt. James Diel	Sgt. William Guarnere	S/Sgt. William Guarnere		
3rd Platoon Sergeant	S/Sgt. C. Carwood Lipton	S/Sgt. C. Carwood Lipton	T/Sgt. Amos J. Taylor	T/Sgt. Amos J. Taylor	S/Sgt. Paul Rogers

==== Carentan ====
The capture of Carentan would allow the Americans to link Omaha and Utah beaches, providing access for armor and equipment. The Germans were aware of its strategic importance and had established defenses. Donald Malarkey wrote later that Lieutenant Winters made him mortar sergeant of second platoon.

The four-day Battle of Carentan began on 10 June 1944. On the morning of June 12, E Company, along with Dog and Fox companies, were walking down the road to Carentan when they came to a y-intersection, and one or two German machine gun teams began firing on them and pinned down Easy Company from a second-story window. Mortars and tanks soon joined the fight. The American soldiers all jumped into ditches for cover. Winters saw this, and as Malarkey wrote, Winters "got hotter than I've ever seen him." Seeing his men bunching up in the ditches—a move that made them easy targets—Lieutenant Richard Winters famously ran into the center of the road, shouting, "You’re gonna die here! Move!" This spurred 1st Platoon, led by Lieutenant Harry Welsh, to charge into the town. It was a fast attack, at the end of which Malarkey said that he could hear moans and groans of wounded soldiers and occasional gun shots. Also at the end of the battle Winters suffered a minor wound in his lower right leg by a ricocheting bullet fragment. The Germans mounted a counterattack, but 2nd Battalion held onto Carentan.

==== Casualties ====
By the time the company was pulled off the line, 22 of its men had been killed in action, including the 17 in Stick 66, and another 43 had been wounded, for a 47% casualty rate. Winters' roster records that of the 139 men of Easy Company who left England on the night of 5 June, just 69 enlisted men and five officers were left: Winters; his three platoon leaders Buck Compton, Harry Welsh, and Warren Roush; and Roush's assistant Francis L. O’Brien.

=== Operation Market Garden ===
As part of the ultimately unsuccessful Operation Market Garden, E Company was assigned to support the British forces around Eindhoven by defending the roads and bridges that would allow British armored divisions to advance into Arnhem and force a crossing over the major bridge across the Rhine in September 1944.

E Company landed on its designated drop zone in the Sonse Forest, northwest of Son, and marched down the road into Son behind the 2nd Battalion's other two companies. On reaching the Son Bridge, they were met by enemy harassing fire while the bridge was destroyed by the Germans. After the Regiment's engineers constructed a makeshift crossing, E and the rest of the 506th moved out for Eindhoven. These events were omitted from the Band of Brothers series, with E having been portrayed as landing in the Netherlands and then marching into Eindhoven to join up with the British Army advancing from the south.

On 19 September, the company departed for Helmond, accompanied by six Cromwell tanks of the British 11th Armoured Division. Their advance was halted by the German 107th Panzer Brigade outside Nuenen and they were forced to retreat to Tongelre. During the days following the link-up, E Company defended the towns of Veghel and Uden until XXX Corps infantry took up the task. As Market Garden progressed, the company and the rest of the 101st joined the 82nd Airborne on "the island" north of Nijmegen.

At the conclusion of Market Garden, the company relieved the British 43rd (Wessex) Infantry Division in Zetten. On 5 October 1944, 1st Platoon fought in the battle of "the island" that lay between the Lower Rhine and the Waal river. Along with a platoon from Fox Company and support from the Royal Artillery, they routed two Waffen-SS companies on 5 October 1944. Colonel Sink issued a general order citing the company's 1st Platoon for gallantry in action, calling their attack a "daring act and skillful maneuver against a numerically superior force".

In October, E Company helped rescue more than 100 British troops trapped since September's Battle of Arnhem in German-occupied territory by the Lower Rhine near the village of Renkum. Dubbed Operation Pegasus, the effort took place during the night of 22–23 October 1944. On the south bank of a Dutch river, Canadian engineers and a patrol of E Company observed the signal and launched their boats, but the British were some 500 to 800 meters upriver of the crossing point. Upon reaching the north bank, E Company established a small perimeter while its soldiers headed east to locate the British troops. The men quickly moved downstream and in the next 90 minutes all of them were evacuated, except for one Russian who was captured by the Germans. The Germans opened fire sporadically and some mortar rounds fell near the crossing, but the fire was inaccurate. The men were later flown back to the UK, rejoining the men who had escaped in Operation Berlin.

Nine members of E Company were killed in action in the Netherlands with at least 40 wounded.

=== Battle of the Bulge ===
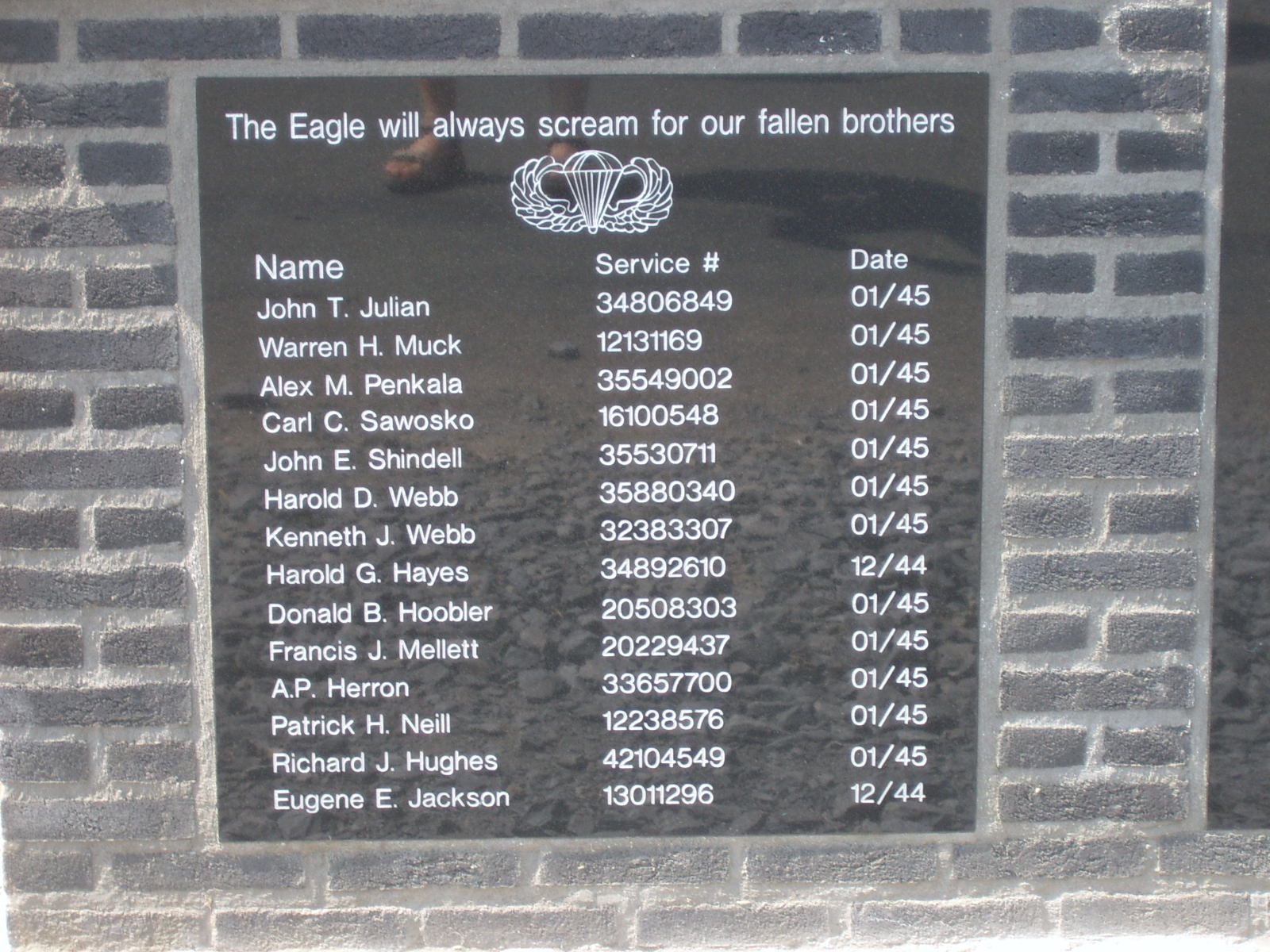
Names of E Company fallen on the monument in Foy

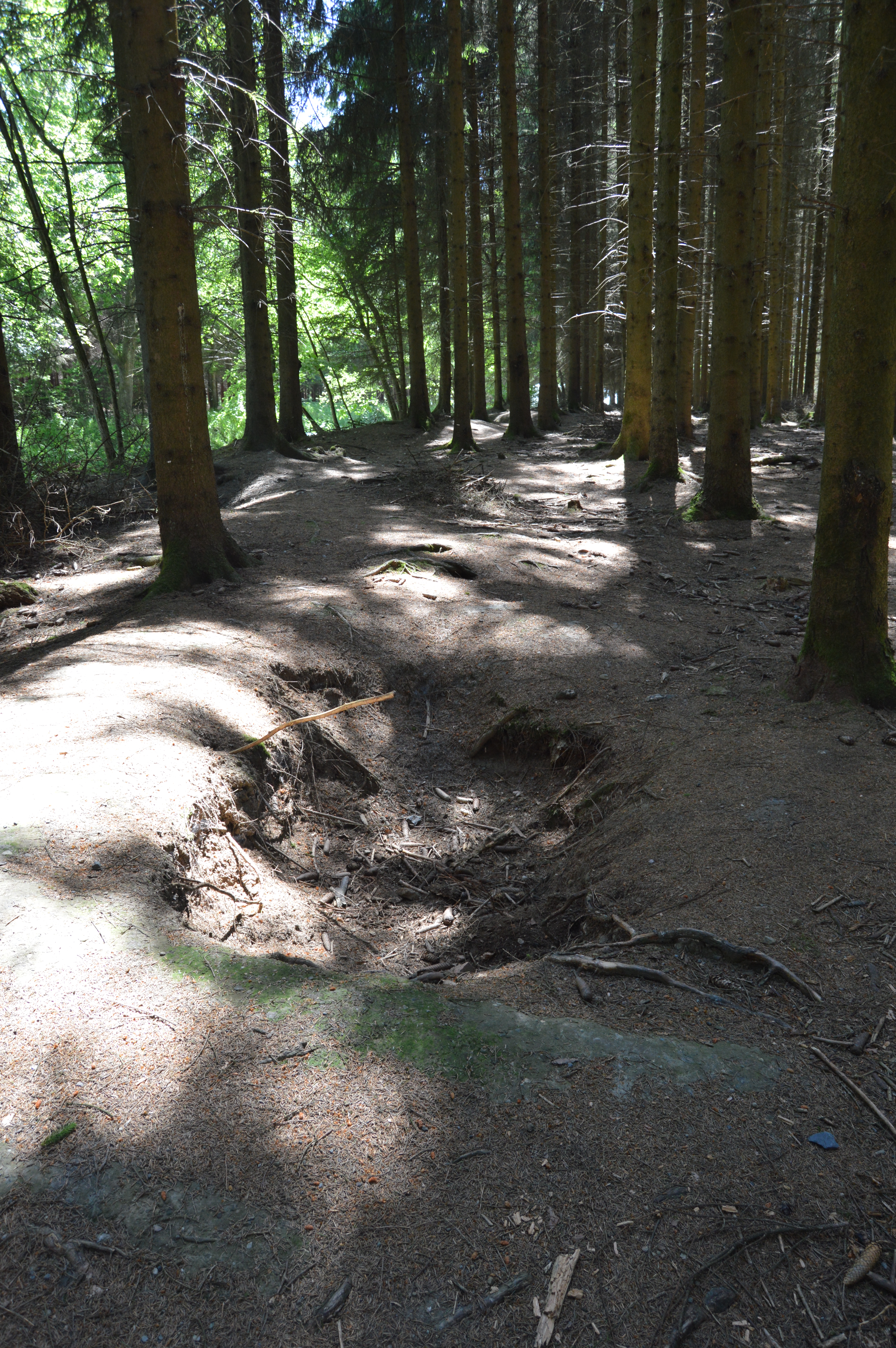
One of the foxholes that still exist in the Jacques Woods, occupied by E Company in December 1944 and January 1945

During December 1944 and January 1945, E Company and the rest of the 101st Airborne Division fought in Belgium in the Battle of the Bulge. The 101st was in France in December when the Germans launched their offensive in the Ardennes. They were told to hold the vital cross-roads at Bastogne and were soon encircled by the Germans. E Company fought in frigid weather under German artillery fire without winter clothing and with limited rations and ammunition.

Between the days of 1 to 13 January, the company took control of the Bois Jacques woods in Belgium, between the town of Foy and Bizory. E Company was assigned to capture the town of Foy.

Division Headquarters ordered the attack to begin at 0900 hours. During the assault, company commander Lieutenant Norman Dike led E Company forward, then ordered 1st platoon (led by Lieutenant Jack Foley) to the left and lost contact with them. Dike ordered the remainder of the company to take cover after coming under fire. With the unit unable to proceed, he was informed by his subordinates that they would get killed if they didn't advance into the town, as they were now unprotected from enemy fire. At the same time, Captain Richard Winters, former company commander and now acting battalion commanding officer, radioed to Dike, telling him the same thing. Dike ordered 1st platoon on a flanking mission around the town, and then found cover and froze, ignoring Winters' orders. As Carwood Lipton, the first sergeant at the time, later put it: "He fell apart."

According to Clancy Lyall, Dike stopped because he had been wounded in the right shoulder (which Lyall saw), not because he had panicked.

In either case, Dike was immediately relieved by First Lieutenant Ronald Speirs under orders from Captain Winters. To countermand Dike's previous orders, Speirs himself ran through the town and German lines (as the 1st platoon had no radio), linked up with the I Company soldiers and relayed the order. Having completed this, he then ran back through the German-occupied town. Carwood Lipton later stated that "the Germans were so shocked at seeing an American soldier running through their lines - they forgot to shoot!" Speirs was reassigned as commanding officer of E Company and remained in that position for the rest of the war.

With the capture of Foy, the Allies defeated the German line in Bastogne. Afterward, E Company and the rest of the 506th PIR moved into Germany. The 101st Airborne Division was awarded a unit citation for holding the line at Bastogne. E Company suffered 82 casualties including 14 killed in action.

=== Finding concentration camps ===
The 101st Airborne Division, along with the 12th Armored Division, found the concentration camp of Kaufering and its subcamps. The camps were discovered between 24 and 27 April 1945. There were eleven camps in total at Kaufering. The main purpose of these camps was the forced construction by prisoners of three underground bunkers for the purpose of protecting German soldiers from Allied bombings.

While on the way to Bavaria, the 101st Airborne was connected to the Seventh United States Army; the company had to stop and refuel their transportation, and the company sent out reconnaissance patrols during their stop. On the patrol, one of the soldiers of E Company, Frank Perconte, and his patrol had discovered a concentration camp. Captain Winters recalls the moment, stating:

By now the men and I were seasoned combat veterans, but the sights witnessed when we arrived at the camp defied description. The horror of what we observed remains with each paratrooper to this day. You could not explain it; you could not describe it; and you could not exaggerate it. It did not take long to realize that the Nazis were intent on eliminating all the Jews, gypsies, and anyone who disagreed with Hitler's regime. The memory of starved, dazed men who dropped their eyes and heads when we looked at them through the chain-link fence, in the same manner that a beaten, mistreated dog would cringe, left a mark on all of us forever. Nor could you underestimate the barbarity of the Nazi regime, even during the latter stages of the war.

After the discovery, Captain Winters ordered local residents and inhabitants to help with aid and clean up the camp, which included cleaning the crematorium and the burial pits.

=== Occupation duties ===
Toward the end of the war, E Company was assigned to occupation duty in Berchtesgaden, Germany, home to Adolf Hitler's Berghof residence. Easy Company entered weeks of 'luxury occupation' in the Bavarian Alps after capturing Berchtesgaden. After weeks of subsisting on barely anything at Bastogne, the area Easy Company was stationed in became a 'souvenir-laden' paradise with units famously 'liberating' wine cellars and high-command transport vehicles, including Hitler's and Göring's staff cars. While troops enjoyed relaxing activities such as fishing in the King River and touring the elaborate tunnel systems, parades were still held, and the Company trained as if it still might be deployed to the Pacific to invade Japan. After that, the company was sent to Austria for further occupation duty. The company mostly attended to various patrols, awaiting the end of the war.

=== Postwar ===
E Company and the rest of the 506th PIR were disbanded in November 1945. It was reactivated in 1954 as a training unit. In 1957, with the abolition of regiments under the Pentomic system, the lineage of Easy Company was deactivated.

Under the Combat Arms Regimental System and U.S. Army Regimental System, Easy Company's lineage and history is distinct from the modern day, as Alpha Company, 2-506 Infantry, of 3rd Brigade Combat Team, "Rakkasan" in the 101st Airborne Division, and by extension, the rest of 2-506 Infantry Regiment, actually carries on the lineage of the World War II-era Baker Company, 506th Parachute Infantry Regiment, and not Easy Company, 506th Parachute Infantry Regiment. For the lineage of Easy Company to be revived, 5th Battalion, 506th Infantry Regiment, or a separate Company E, 506th Infantry Regiment, would have to be activated.

== Notable personnel ==
External videos
- Panel discussion with Lynn "Buck" Compton, Bill Guarnere, Edward "Babe" J. Heffron, Donald Malarkey, and Earl McClung, 10 November 2006, C-SPAN

140 men formed the original E Company in Camp Toccoa, Georgia. A total of 366 men are listed as having belonged to the company by the war's end, due to transfers and replacements. 49 men of E Company were killed in action.

Note: The commanders are listed by chronological order of their command; the other lists are sorted by rank, then alphabetically by last name.

=== Company commanders ===
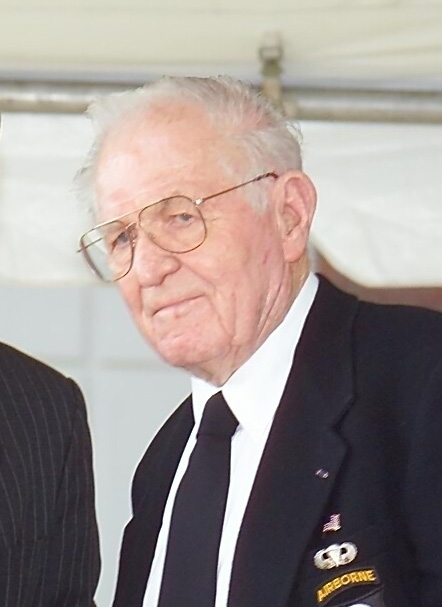
Richard Winters in 2004.

- Captain Herbert Maxwell Sobel (26 January 1912 – 30 September 1987)
- First Lieutenant Thomas Meehan III (8 July 1921 – 6 June 1944)
- Major Richard Davis "Dick" Winters (21 January 1918 – 2 January 2011)
- First Lieutenant Frederick Theodore "Moose" Heyliger (23 June 1916 – 3 November 2001)
- First Lieutenant Norman Staunton Dike Jr. (19 May 1918 – 23 June 1989)
- Captain Ronald Charles Speirs (20 April 1920 – 11 April 2007)

=== Junior officers ===
- Captain Lewis Nixon (30 September 1918 – 11 January 1995)
- First Lieutenant Lynn Davis "Buck" Compton (31 December 1921 – 25 February 2012)
- First Lieutenant Edward David "Ed" Shames (13 June 1922 – 3 December 2021)
- First Lieutenant Harry F. Welsh (27 September 1918 – 21 January 1995)
- Second Lieutenant Robert Burnham "Bob" Brewer (31 January 1924 – 5 December 1996)
- Second Lieutenant Clifford Carwood "Lip" Lipton (30 January 1920 – 16 December 2001)

=== Non-commissioned officers ===
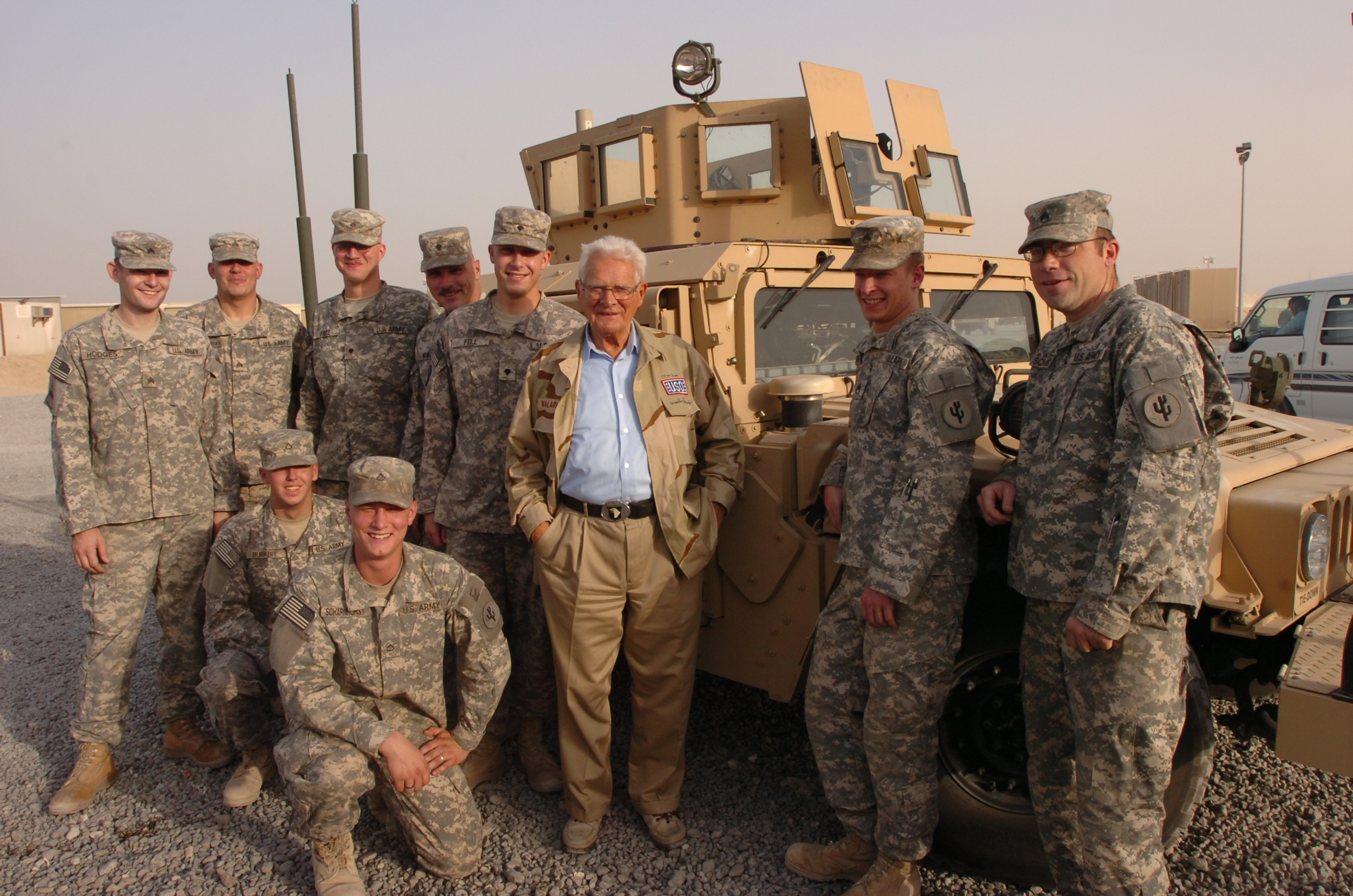
Don Malarkey with U.S. soldiers in Camp Arifjan, Kuwait (September 2008).

- Technical Sergeant Donald George "Don" Malarkey (30 July 1921 – 30 September 2017)
- Staff Sergeant William J. "Wild Bill" Guarnere Sr. (28 April 1923 – 8 March 2014) (served as a platoon leader as Staff Sergeant, before demotion)
- Staff Sergeant Herman "Hank, Hack" Hanson (3 January 1918 – 15 May 1971)
- Staff Sergeant Denver "Bull" Randleman (20 November 1920 – 26 June 2003)
- Staff Sergeant Darrell Cecil "Shifty" Powers (13 March 1923 – 17 June 2009)
- Sergeant Warren Harold "Skip" Muck (31 January 1922 – 10 January 1945)
- Sergeant Robert Emory "Popeye" Wynn Jr. (10 July 1921 – 18 March 2000)
- Technician 4th Grade Frank Perconte (10 March 1917 – 24 October 2013)
- Corporal Walter Scott "Smokey" Gordon Jr. (15 April 1920 – 19 April 1997)
- Staff Sergeant Earl "One Lung" McClung (27 April 1923 – 27 November 2013)
- Sergeant Gordon Carson (30 July 1924 – 13 November 1998)

=== Enlisted men ===
- Sergeant James H “Moe” Alley (20 July 1922 – 14 March 2008)
- Technician Fourth Grade George Luz (17 June 1921 – 15 October 1998)
- Sergeant Edward James "Babe" Heffron (16 May 1923 – 1 December 2013)
- Private Edward Joseph "Tip" Tipper (3 August 1921 – 1 February 2017)
- Private First Class David Kenyon Webster (2 June 1922 – 9 September 1961)
- Private Albert Blithe (25 June 1923 – 17 December 1967)
- Private First Class Bradford Clark Freeman (4 September 1924 – 3 July 2022). He was the last living member of the unit.
- Medic Eugene Gilbert "Doc" Roe Sr (17 October 1922 – 30 December 1998)

== See also ==
- We Who Are Alive and Remain: Untold Stories From the Band of Brothers
