= Lynn Compton =

Easy Company soldier and jurist (1921–2012)

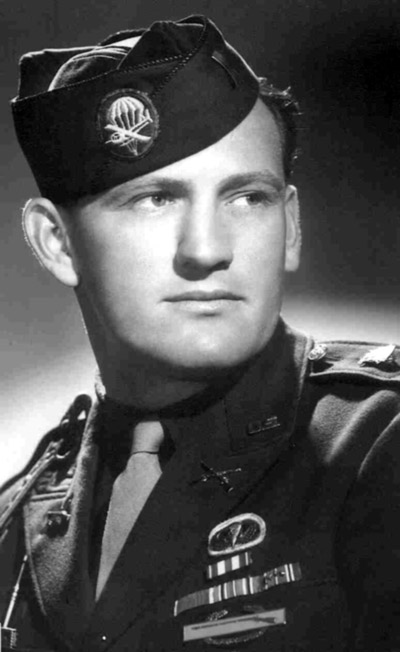
- Lynn Compton in his uniform during World War II

Associate Justice of the California Court of Appeal, Second District, Division Two
- In office June 15, 1970 – August 31, 1990
- Appointed by: Ronald Reagan
- Preceded by: Donald Wright
- Succeeded by: Michael G. Nott

Chief Deputy District Attorney of Los Angeles County
- In office 1964–1970
- Appointed by: Evelle J. Younger

Los Angeles Deputy District Attorney
- In office 1951–1966

Personal details
- Born: Lynn Davis Compton; December 31, 1921 Los Angeles, California, US
- Died: February 25, 2012 (aged 90) Burlington, Washington, US
- Spouse: Donna
- Children: 2 daughters
- Awards: Silver Star; Bronze Star; Purple Heart
- Website: Court of Appeal website
- Nickname: Buck

Military service
- Allegiance: United States
- Branch/service: United States Army; United States Air Force Reserve
- Years of service: 1943–1945 (U.S. Army); 1947–1970 (U.S. Air Force Reserve)
- Rank: First Lieutenant (U.S. Army); Lieutenant Colonel (U.S. Air Force Reserve)
- Unit: E Company, 2nd Battalion, 506th Parachute Infantry Regiment, 101st Airborne Division
- Battles/wars: World War II: Battle of Normandy; Operation Market Garden (WIA); Battle of the Bulge
- Police career
- Department: Los Angeles Police Department
- Service years: 1947 - 1951
- Rank: Detective

Lynn Davis "Buck" Compton (December 31, 1921 – February 25, 2012) was an American jurist, law enforcement officer, and United States Army officer during World War II, serving as a paratrooper in "Easy Company" of the 506th Infantry Regiment within the 101st Airborne Division.

After the war, he joined the Los Angeles Police Department and later the Los Angeles County District Attorney's office, where he rose to the position of chief deputy district attorney. He acted as the lead prosecutor in the trial of Sirhan Sirhan for the assassination of Robert F. Kennedy. He was eventually appointed as an associate justice on the California Court of Appeal.

Compton's World War II exploits were depicted in the 1992 book Band of Brothers by historian Stephen E. Ambrose, and the 2001 HBO miniseries of the same name, in which Compton was portrayed by Neal McDonough.

== Early life ==
Compton was born in Los Angeles, California. Early on, he gave himself the nickname "Buck" due to feeling that Lynn was a name better suited to a girl. His mother Ethel worked for movie studios and a young Compton worked as an extra in films. He was thrown off the set of Modern Times after angering the film's star Charlie Chaplin. He was an athlete at the University of California, Los Angeles (UCLA), being named an all-conference catcher and All-American selection in 1942. Among his baseball teammates was Jackie Robinson. Compton was later inducted into the UCLA Baseball Hall of Fame. He majored in physical education, with a minor in education. He joined the Phi Kappa Psi fraternity in 1940. He also started at guard with the UCLA football team in the 1943 Rose Bowl game on January 1, 1943.

== Military service ==
At UCLA, Compton participated in the Reserve Officers' Training Corps under Cadet Commander John Singlaub. In early 1943, advanced ROTC was suspended for the duration of the war, with Compton and his fellow infantry cadets completing their training by attending officer candidate school at Fort Benning, Georgia. In December 1943, Compton deployed overseas with E ("Easy") Company, 2nd Battalion, 506th Parachute Infantry Regiment in the 101st Airborne Division. During Operation Overlord, Compton participated in Easy Company's action at Brécourt Manor under the leadership of Richard Winters. Compton and his fellow paratroopers assaulted a German battery of four 105 mm howitzers firing on Utah Beach, disabling the guns and routing the enemy. During the battle, he threw a hand grenade that was said to have had no arc and hit the German soldier on the back of the helmet. Compton was awarded the Silver Star for his action in the battle.

Later in 1944, Compton was shot through the buttocks while participating in Operation Market Garden, the Allies' ill-fated attempt to seize a number of bridges in the Netherlands and cross the Rhine River into Nazi Germany. The bullet traveled sideways, through one side of the buttocks and out the other side. After a partial recovery, he returned to Easy Company in time for the siege in the frozen Ardennes; the Battle of the Bulge.

During the battle, Compton was evacuated for severe trench foot. Stephen E. Ambrose concluded that Compton had been "unnerved" by witnessing two of his closest friends, Joe Toye and William Guarnere, badly wounded by German artillery. Compton wrote in his autobiography, "...although I was affected by the horrors of Bastogne, I do not believe I was clinically shell shocked, as the series portrays me. In real life, while I was hollering for the medic, trying to figure out what to do, I remember two distinct thoughts: How are we going to help the wounded guys?...Maybe this is the time the Germans are really going to get us all." In December 1945 he was discharged from service and returned home to California.

In 1947, he joined the Air Force Reserve, serving in the Office of Special Investigations and eventually Judge Advocate General Corps before retiring as a lieutenant colonel in 1970.

== Post-war ==
=== Criminal justice career ===
In 1946, Compton returned to UCLA to complete his degree; he turned down an offer to play minor league baseball, choosing instead to concentrate on his continued public service aspirations. Compton married Donna Newman in October 1947 and the couple adopted two daughters.

Compton became employed as a police officer with the Los Angeles Police Department (LAPD) in 1946, also attending Loyola Law School. Compton quickly rose through the LAPD ranks, becoming a detective in the Central Burglary Division. He left the LAPD for the District Attorney's office in 1951, serving as a deputy district attorney. In 1964, LA District Attorney Evelle J. Younger appointed Compton to the position of chief deputy district attorney.

In 1968–69, Compton led the successful prosecution of Sirhan Sirhan for the murder of Robert F. Kennedy. In 1970, then-Governor Ronald Reagan appointed him an associate justice of the California Courts of Appeal. He retired from the bench in 1990.

=== Later life and death ===
In the 2000s, Compton's World War II exploits were portrayed in the HBO miniseries Band of Brothers.

Compton's memoirs, entitled Call of Duty and written with Marcus Brotherton, were published by Berkeley Publishing in May 2008. A celebration of Compton's 90th birthday was held in January 2012 with nearly 200 in attendance including Band of Brothers actors Michael Cudlitz, James Madio, Neal McDonough, and Richard Speight, Jr. McDonough, the actor playing Compton, developed a friendship with the real Compton while making the miniseries and kept in touch afterwards. McDonough's son Morgan is nicknamed "Little Buck" in honor of Compton.

In January 2012, Compton suffered a heart attack. On February 25, 2012, he died at a daughter's home in Burlington, Washington. His wife Donna died previously in 1994.

Today, Loyola Law School honors Compton with the Lynn D. "Buck" Compton Veterans Law Association, promoting "social interaction amongst military veterans, active duty, National Guard, and reserve personnel at Loyola Law School while encouraging public interest in, and pro bono work on, issues relating to the welfare of military personnel and veterans."

== Bibliography ==
- Compton, Lynn D., with Marcus Brotherton (2008). Call of Duty: My Life Before, During, and After the Band of Brothers. Berkley Caliber. ISBN 978-0-425-21970-6.
- Ambrose, Stephen E. (1992). Band of Brothers: Easy Company, 506th Regiment, 101st Airborne from Normandy to Hitler's Eagle's Nest. Simon & Schuster. ISBN 978-0-7434-6411-6.
