= Call of Duty (book) =

2008 book by Lynn "Buck" Compton

- Author: Lt. Lynn Compton
- Publisher: Penguin Publishing Group
- Publication date: 6 May 2008
- ISBN: 9781440630323

Call of Duty: My Life Before, During, and After the Band of Brothers is the title of Lt. Lynn "Buck" Compton's memoirs. Buck was made famous by the popular HBO World War II miniseries, Band of Brothers, by the book of the same title by historian Stephen Ambrose, and his involvement in Sirhan Sirhan's trial for the murder of Robert F. Kennedy.

Published by Berkley Publishing, it was released on May 6, 2008, and features an epilogue by Neal McDonough.
