= Carwood Lipton =

WWII American army officer (1920–2001)

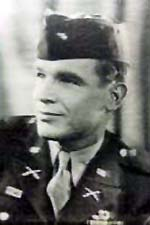
- First Lieutenant Lipton in service uniform
- Born: 30 January 1920; Huntington, West Virginia, US
- Died: 16 December 2001 (aged 81); Southern Pines, North Carolina, US
- Burial place: Woodmere Memorial Park, Huntington, West Virginia
- Military career
- Allegiance: United States
- Branch: United States Army
- Service years: 1942–1953
- Rank: First Lieutenant
- Nickname: "Lip"
- Units: Easy Company, 506th Parachute Infantry Regiment, 101st Airborne Division
- Conflicts: World War II: Battle of Normandy; Operation Market Garden; Battle of the Bulge
- Awards: Bronze Star Medal (2); Purple Heart (3)
- Other work: Glass-manufacturing executive

Clifford Carwood Lipton (30 January 1920 – 16 December 2001) was a commissioned officer with Easy Company, 506th Parachute Infantry Regiment, 101st Airborne Division, during World War II.

On the battlefields of Europe, he was promoted to company first sergeant and was awarded a battlefield commission to second lieutenant. He has said "it was the greatest honor ever awarded" to him. He eventually earned a promotion to first lieutenant before leaving the army.

He was featured in the 2010 book A Company of Heroes: Personal Memories about the Real Band of Brothers and the Legacy They Left Us, and portrayed by Donnie Wahlberg in the HBO miniseries Band of Brothers.

== Early life ==
Carwood Lipton was born and raised in Huntington, West Virginia. When he was aged 10, his father was killed and his mother paralyzed in an automobile accident. Since Carwood was the eldest child, she told him to be the "man of the family". After completing one year at Marshall College in Huntington, he left school due to financial troubles at home and went to work in war-related production.

After reading an article in Life magazine on the difficulty of paratrooper training, and how the Airborne was one of the most highly trained branches of the Army, Lipton enlisted in the Army on 15 August 1942, at Fort Thomas, Kentucky, volunteering for the paratroops.

== Military career ==
Lipton was assigned to Easy Company of the 506th, becoming one of its first four privates. He quickly rose through the ranks of the company, becoming a Sergeant, then Platoon Sergeant prior to D-Day. He eventually became company first sergeant, after Bill Evans, the original Company First Sergeant since Toccoa, was killed in action in Normandy, and acting Company First Sergeant James Diel was given a battlefield commission and transferred within the 506th. Lipton always kept the men's spirits high and pushed them to their full potential, an act recognized by the officers of Easy Company.

=== Normandy ===
Lipton was the jumpmaster on one of the C-47 Skytrains during the American airborne landings in Normandy in the early-morning hours of 6 June 1944. Parachuting into the Cotentin Peninsula, he was able to rendezvous with First Lieutenant Richard Winters and several others from the 101st and 82nd Airborne Division. They were later reunited with several more Easy Company members and worked their way just south of their objective of Carentan.

Later that day, Easy Company was given the task of silencing an artillery battery at the estate of Brécourt Manor, half a mile (1 km) north of Sainte-Marie-du-Mont and three and a half miles (5.6 km) southwest of Utah Beach, where four 105 mm howitzers fired down onto a causeway exit off the beach and prevented the U.S. 4th Infantry Division from moving further inland. In the subsequent assault on Brécourt Manor, Lipton, teamed with Private Mike Ranney, climbed a tree at some distance, and using an M1 carbine, shot a German soldier defending the battery. His actions during the assault earned him his first Bronze Star.

Less than a week later, Lipton took part in the Battle of Carentan, a coastal town that needed to be captured for the Allies at Utah Beach to link up with the Allied forces further toward the east. During the battle, he was wounded in the face and groin by shrapnel from a nearby impact of a German 88 mm artillery shell. His wounds were minor and earned him his first Purple Heart.

=== Market Garden ===
Easy Company's slowly depleting ranks became a problem during the run-up to Operation Market Garden. As a result, vacancies were being filled by replacement soldiers. Many Easy Company veterans who joined the company ranks in such a way had positive memories of Lipton, as they easily warmed up to Lipton due to his immediate acceptance of them as fellow soldiers.

Lipton was with Easy Company when they liberated Eindhoven, a city in the southern Netherlands near the country's Belgian border. He was part of an advance team that scouted ahead of the rest of the company. In October 1944, he helped rescue a large detachment of scattered troops of the British 1st Parachute Division who had managed to evade capture after the battle of Arnhem.

=== Ardennes ===
After Easy Company's assault on the town of Foy, Lipton was told he would be awarded a battlefield commission as a second lieutenant. He received his commission in Haguenau. Lipton later witnessed the horrors of the Holocaust at Kaufering concentration camp.

Lipton helped Easy Company capture Hitler's Eagles' Nest winter retreat at Berchtesgaden, where he became acquainted with Ferdinand Porsche (partially responsible for the Panther and Tiger tanks, as well as the design and production of the Volkswagen Beetle), who spoke English very well. They would eat their meals together while Porsche was in a POW camp. Lipton remained with Easy Company until the unit was disbanded after Japan surrendered. He remained in the Army Reserve through the Korean War, but would never be deployed overseas again.

== Later years ==
Upon Lipton's return to the United States, he enrolled at Marshall University and completed his final three years graduating with a degree in engineering. After graduation, Lipton received a job with Owens Illinois Inc., a manufacturer of glass products and plastics packaging. He rapidly advanced in the company and by 1952 had become chief operator.

In 1966, Lipton moved to Bridgeton, New Jersey, where he became an administrative manager. In 1967, Owens Illinois purchased a 50 percent interest in Giralt Laporta, a Madrid glass container company, and Lipton became general manager of the company. In 1971, he and his wife moved to London, where he was the Director of Manufacturing for eight glass companies in England and Scotland for several years. In 1982, he moved to Toledo, Ohio, and retired a year later from his post as Director of International Development. Lipton spent his retirement years in the town of Southern Pines, North Carolina.

Lipton appeared on two television shows, providing commentary in the HBO mini-series Band of Brothers and an accompanying documentary, We Stand Alone Together: The Men of Easy Company.

Carwood Lipton died on 16 December 2001, of pulmonary fibrosis in Pinehurst, North Carolina. He was survived by his wife Marie, three sons from his first marriage to Jo Anne who died in 1975, five grandchildren, and eight great-grandchildren.

== Bibliography ==
- Alexander, L. (2005). Biggest Brother: The Life of Major Dick Winters. London: Penguin. ISBN 9781440678257.
- Ambrose, S. (1992). Band of Brothers: Easy Company. New York: Simon & Schuster. ISBN 9780743464116.
- Brotherton, M. (2010). A Company of Heroes. New York: Berkley Caliber. ISBN 9780425234204.
- Guarnere, W.; Heffron, E. (2007). Brothers in Battle, Best of Friends. London: Penguin. ISBN 9781101207574.
- Winters, R.; Kingseed, C. (2006). Beyond Band of Brothers. New York: Dutton Caliber. ISBN 9781101205662.
