= 10.5 cm Gebirgshaubitze 40 =

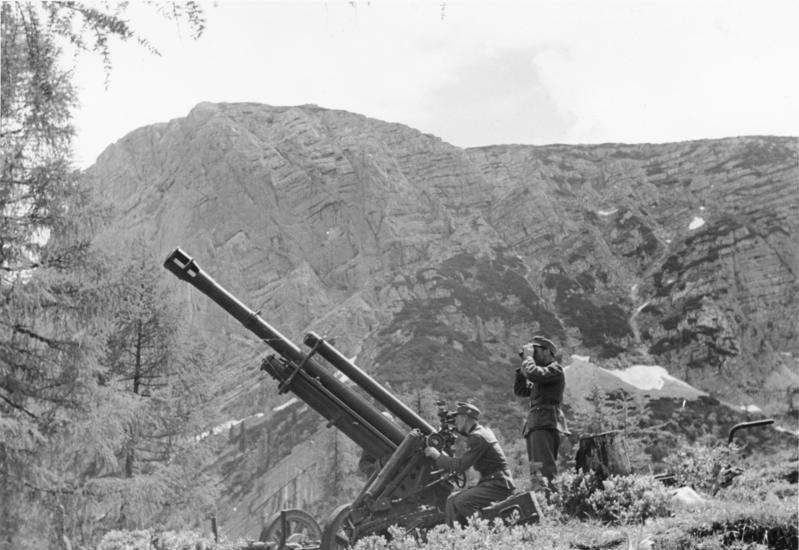
- Type: Mountain gun
- Place of origin: Nazi Germany

Service history
- In service: 1942–65
- Used by: Nazi Germany
- Wars: Second World War

Production history
- Designer: Böhler
- Designed: 1938–40
- Manufacturer: Böhler
- Produced: 1942–45
- No. built: 420

Specifications
- Mass: 1,660 kg (3,660 lb)
- Barrel length: 2.87 metres (9 ft 5 in) L/30
- Shell: Separate QF; 105 x 284 mm R
- Shell weight: 14.52 kg (32 lb 0 oz)
- Caliber: 105 mm (4.1 in)
- Breech: Horizontal sliding-block
- Recoil: Hydro-pneumatic
- Carriage: Split trail
- Elevation: -4° 30' to +71°
- Traverse: 51°
- Rate of fire: 4–6 rpm
- Muzzle velocity: 565 m/s (1,850 ft/s)
- Maximum firing range: 12.6 km (7.8 mi)

The 10.5 cm Gebirgshaubitze 40 (10.5 cm GebH 40) was a 10.5 cm (4.1 in) German mountain howitzer used during World War II. A total of 420 were built during World War II. It saw action with German mountain divisions in Finland, Italy, France, on the Eastern Front and in the Balkans from 1942. It served with a number of European countries into the 1960s.

== Development and description ==
The 10.5 cm GebH 40 was designed to meet an Army requirement for a 10.5 cm howitzer to serve in the mountain divisions (Gebirgs Divisionen). Both Rheinmetall and Böhler submitted designs for troop trials in 1940 and Böhler was selected for production, although actual production did not begin until 1942. Some 420 were built between 1942 and 1945.

The design of the 10.5 cm GebH 40 was relatively conventional in regard to the gun itself, with its standard German horizontal sliding block breech, split trail carriage with removable spades, and muzzle brake, but the carriage differed considerably from those typically used in the German army. The wheels were made from light-alloy with solid rubber tires, and their spring suspension was fixed to the legs of the split-trail carriage and would "toe-in" when the legs were spread out in preparation for firing. A firing pedestal was positioned underneath the front of the carriage so that the howitzer had three points of support when firing and also minimized the time needed to find a firing position by reducing the amount of level space required (three level spots being easier to find than four). It could be either towed fully assembled, broken down into four loads on single-axle trailers towed by Sd.Kfz. 2 "Kettenkrad" half-track motorcycles or broken down into five pack-loads to be carried by mules. It remains the heaviest mountain howitzer ever made at 1,660 kg (3,660 lb), but some consider it one of the best mountain guns ever made and it remained in service until the 1960s with various European countries.

Two different range figures have been quoted for the 10.5 cm GebH 40, 12,625 metres (13,807 yd) and 16,740 metres (18,310 yd). The former figure seems more plausible when compared to 10.5 cm howitzers with roughly similar barrel lengths and muzzle velocities like the 10.5 cm leFH 18 and the American M-2.

=== Ammunition ===
The 10.5 cm GebH 40 fired a wide variety of ammunition, with the notable exception of a conventional armor-piercing shell. It used instead the standard three types of 10.5 cm hollow-charge armor-piercing shells developed over the course of the war and shared its illumination shell with the 10.5 cm leFH 18. However it used unique high-explosive and smoke shells. It used six increments of propellant which were added together to reach the desired range. A seventh charge could be used which replaced all the other charges for targets at the limit of the howitzer's range.

== Sources ==
- Engelmann, Joachim and Scheibert, Horst. Deutsche Artillerie 1934–1945: Eine Dokumentation in Text, Skizzen und Bildern: Ausrüstung, Gliederung, Ausbildung, Führung, Einsatz. Limburg/Lahn, Germany: C. A. Starke, 1974
- Gander, Terry and Chamberlain, Peter. Weapons of the Third Reich: An Encyclopedic Survey of All Small Arms, Artillery and Special Weapons of the German Land Forces 1939–1945. New York: Doubleday, 1979 ISBN 0-385-15090-3
- Hogg, Ian V. German Artillery of World War Two. 2nd corrected edition. Mechanicsville, PA: Stackpole Books, 1997 ISBN 1-85367-480-X
