= Richard Winters =

United States Army officer and veteran (1918–2011)

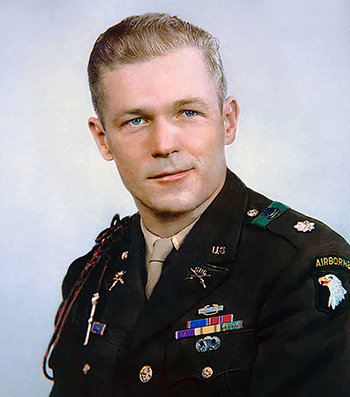
- Portrait of Winters in his dress uniform
- Born: January 21, 1918; New Holland, Pennsylvania, U.S.
- Died: January 2, 2011 (aged 92); Palmyra, Pennsylvania, U.S.
- Burial place: Bergstrasse Evangelical Lutheran Church Cemetery; Ephrata, Pennsylvania, U.S.
- Spouse: Ethel Estoppey (m. 1948)
- Children: Richard Winters (son); Edith Winters (daughter)
- Military career
- Allegiance: United States
- Branch: United States Army
- Service years: 1941–1946; 1950–1952
- Rank: Major
- Nickname: Dick Winters
- Service number: 0-1286582 (officer); 33110272 (enlisted)
- Commands: E Company, 2nd Battalion, 506th Parachute Infantry Regiment, 101st Airborne Division
- Conflicts: See battles: World War II; Operation Overlord, D-Day; Operation Market Garden; Battle of the Bulge; Battle of Bastogne; Western Allied invasion of Germany; Korean War
- Awards: Distinguished Service Cross; Bronze Star Medal; Purple Heart
- Other work: Businessman, guest lecturer

Richard Davis Winters (January 21, 1918 – January 2, 2011) was a United States Army officer who served as a paratrooper in "Easy Company" of the 506th Infantry Regiment within the 101st Airborne Division during World War II. Winters was awarded the Distinguished Service Cross for his successful command of the assault on Brécourt Manor during the invasion of Normandy.

His exploits were featured in numerous books and in the 2001 HBO mini-series Band of Brothers, in which he was portrayed by actor Damian Lewis.

== Early life and education ==
Winters was born in New Holland, Pennsylvania, to Richard and Edith Winters on January 21, 1918. The family soon moved to nearby Ephrata, and then to Lancaster when he was eight years old. He graduated from Lancaster Boys High School in 1937 and attended Franklin and Marshall College.

At Franklin and Marshall, Winters was a member of the Upsilon chapter of Delta Sigma Phi fraternity and participated in intramural football and basketball. He had to give up wrestling, his favorite sport, and most of his social activities in favor of his studies and the part-time jobs that paid his way through college. He graduated in June 1941 with a bachelor's degree in economics, earning the highest academic standing in the business college.

== Military service ==
=== Second World War ===
==== Training ====
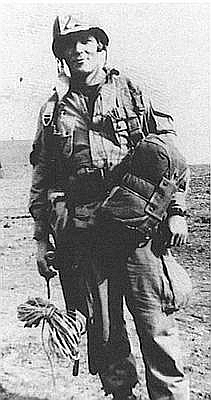
Winters at Camp Toccoa, 1942

Winters wrote in his memoirs that he chose to volunteer for induction under Selective Service after graduating from college and complete the required one year of service rather than waiting for a conventional call-up at a later date that might "interrupt a promising business career," subsequently availing himself of any future service commitment should the United States remain neutral; though Winters "felt a strong sense of duty," he "had no desire to get into the war." Winters was inducted into the Army on August 25, 1941, at the New Cumberland Reception Center near Harrisburg, Pennsylvania. In September, he was assigned to Camp Croft, South Carolina, for basic training. While the rest of his fellow trainees were deployed to units stationed in the Panama Canal Zone in early December, Winters remained at Camp Croft to help train draftees and other volunteers. In April 1942, four months after the United States entered World War II, he was selected to attend Officer Candidate School (OCS) at Fort Benning, Georgia. There he became friends with Lewis Nixon, with whom he would serve throughout the war. He was commissioned as a second lieutenant in the infantry after graduating from OCS on July 2, 1942.

During his officer training, Winters decided to join the parachute infantry, part of the U.S. Army's new airborne forces. Upon completing training, he returned to Camp Croft to train another class of draftees as there were no positions available in the paratroopers at that time. After five weeks, he received orders to join the 506th Parachute Infantry Regiment (506th PIR) at Camp Toccoa in Georgia. The 506th was commanded by Colonel Robert Sink.

Winters arrived at Toccoa in mid-August 1942 and was assigned to Company E, 2nd Battalion, 506th PIR, which later became better known as "Easy Company" in accordance with the contemporaneous Joint Army/Navy Phonetic Alphabet. Serving under First Lieutenant Herbert Sobel, Winters was made platoon leader of 2nd Platoon, earning a promotion to first lieutenant in October 1942 and made acting company executive officer, although this was not made official until May 1943. The 506th PIR was an experimental unit, the first regiment to undertake airborne training as a formed unit. The training at Toccoa was very tough. Of the 500 officers who had volunteered, only 148 completed the course; of 5,000 enlisted volunteers, only 1,800 were ultimately selected for duty as paratroopers.

On June 10, 1943, after more tactical training at Camp Mackall, North Carolina, the 506th PIR was attached to Major General William Lee's 101st "Screaming Eagles" Airborne Division. Later in the year, they embarked on the Samaria, and arrived in Liverpool on September 15, 1943. They proceeded to Aldbourne, Wiltshire, where they began intense training for the Allied invasion of Europe planned for spring 1944.

In November and December 1943, while Easy Company was at Aldbourne, the tension that had been brewing between Winters and Sobel came to a head. For some time, Winters had privately held concerns over Sobel's ability to lead the company in combat. Many of the enlisted men in the company had come to respect Winters for his competence and had also developed their own concerns about Sobel's leadership. Winters later said that he never wanted to compete with Sobel for command of Easy Company; still, Sobel attempted to bring Winters up on trumped-up charges for "failure to carry out a lawful order". Feeling that his punishment was unjust, Winters requested that the charge be reviewed by court-martial. After Winters' punishment was set aside by the battalion commander, Major Robert L. Strayer, Sobel brought Winters up on another charge the following day. During the investigation, Winters was transferred to the Headquarters Company and appointed as the battalion mess officer.

In the wake of this incident, several of the company's non-commissioned officers (NCOs) delivered an ultimatum to the regimental commander, Colonel Sink, threatening to surrender their stripes unless Sobel was replaced. Winters tried unsuccessfully to talk them out of taking this step. Sink was not impressed by the threat, and several of the NCOs were subsequently demoted or transferred out of the company. Nevertheless, he realized that something had to be done and decided to transfer Sobel out of Easy Company, giving him command of a new parachute training school at Chilton Foliat. Winters' court-martial was set aside and he returned to Easy Company as leader of 1st Platoon. Winters later said he felt that despite his differences with Sobel, at least part of Easy Company's success had been due to Sobel's strenuous training and high expectations. In February 1944, First Lieutenant Thomas Meehan was given command of Easy Company.

==== Summer 1944 ====
Meehan remained in command of the company until the invasion of Normandy, when at about 1:15 a.m. on June 6, 1944, D-Day, the C-47 Skytrain transporting most of the company Headquarters Section was shot down by German anti-aircraft fire, killing everyone on board. Winters jumped that night and landed safely near Sainte-Mère-Église. Losing his weapon during the drop, he nevertheless oriented himself, assembled several paratroopers, including members of the 82nd Airborne Division, and proceeded toward the unit's assigned objective near Sainte-Marie-du-Mont. With Meehan's fate unknown, Winters became the de facto commanding officer (CO) of Easy Company, which he remained for the duration of the Normandy campaign.

Later that day, Winters led the Brécourt Manor Assault which successfully destroyed a battery of German 105mm howitzers, which were firing onto the causeways that served as the principal exits from Utah Beach. The Americans estimated that the guns, which were south of the village of Le Grand-Chemin, were defended by about a platoon of 50 German troops, while Winters had 13 men. The attack has since been taught at West Point as a textbook example of an assault on a fixed position by a numerically inferior force. In addition to destroying the battery, Winters also obtained a map that showed German gun emplacements near Utah Beach.

On July 1, 1944, Winters was told that he had been promoted to captain. The next day, he was presented with the Distinguished Service Cross (DSC) by Lieutenant General Omar Bradley, then the commander of the U.S. First Army. Shortly after, the 506th Parachute Infantry was withdrawn from France and returned to Aldbourne, England, for reorganization. The citation for his DSC reads as follows:

The President of the United States of America, authorized by Act of Congress, July 9, 1918, takes pleasure in presenting the Distinguished Service Cross to First Lieutenant (Infantry) Richard D. Winters (ASN: 0-1286582), United States Army, for extraordinary heroism in connection with military operations against an armed enemy while serving with Company E, 2d Battalion, 506th Parachute Infantry Regiment, 101st Airborne Division, in action against enemy forces on 6 June 1944, in France. First Lieutenant Winters with seven enlisted men, advanced through intense enemy automatic weapons fire, putting out of action two guns of the battery of four 88-mm. that were shelling the beachhead. Unswerving in his determination to complete his self-appointed and extremely hazardous task, First Lieutenant Winters and his group withdrew for reinforcements. He returned with tank support and the remaining two guns were put out of action, resulting in decreased opposition to our forces landing on the beachhead. First Lieutenant Winters' heroic and determined leadership exemplify the highest traditions of the military forces of the United States and reflect great credit upon himself, the 101st Airborne Division, and the United States Army.

==== Autumn 1944 ====
In September 1944, the 506th PIR parachuted into the Netherlands, near the village of Son, north of Eindhoven, as part of Operation Market Garden, a combined airborne and armored operation. On 5 October 1944, a German force attacked the 2nd Battalion's flank and threatened to break through the American lines. At the same time, four men in an Easy Company patrol were wounded. Returning to headquarters, they reported they had encountered a large group of Germans at a crossroads about 1,300 yards (1,200 m) to the east of the company command post. Realizing the seriousness of the situation, Winters took one squad from 1st Platoon, and moved off toward the crossroads, where they observed a German machine gun firing to the south, toward the battalion headquarters, from a long distance. After surveying the position, Winters led the squad in an assault on the gun crew. Soon after taking the position, the squad took fire from a German position opposite them. Estimating this position was held by at least a platoon, Winters called for reinforcements from the rest of the 1st Platoon and led them, and a platoon from Fox Company in a successful assault. Later it was discovered there had been at least 300 Germans.

On October 9, Winters became the battalion executive officer (XO), following the death of the battalion's former XO, Major Oliver Horton. Although this position was normally held by a major, Winters filled it as a captain. The 101st Airborne Division was withdrawn to France soon afterward.

==== Winter 1944–1945 and spring 1945 ====
On December 16, 1944, German forces launched a counter-offensive against the Western Allies in Belgium, starting the Battle of the Bulge. The 101st Airborne Division was trucked to the Bastogne area two days later. Still serving as XO of the 2nd Battalion, Winters helped defend the line northeast of Bastogne near the town of Foy. The entire 101st Airborne and elements of the 10th Armored Division battled about 15 German divisions, supported by heavy artillery and armor, for nearly a week before Lieutenant General George Patton's U.S. Third Army broke through the German lines surrounding Bastogne, reopening ground supply lines.

After being relieved by Patton, the 2nd Battalion attacked Foy on January 9, 1945. On March 8, 1945, the 2nd Battalion was moved to Haguenau in Alsace, after which Winters was promoted to major. Shortly afterwards, Robert Strayer, now a lieutenant colonel, was elevated to the regimental staff and Winters took over as acting commander of the 2nd Battalion.

In April, the battalion carried out defensive duties along the Rhine before moving to Bavaria later in the month. In early May, the 101st Airborne Division received orders to capture Berchtesgaden. The 2nd Battalion set out from the town of Thale through streams of surrendering German soldiers and reached the alpine retreat at noon on 5 May 1945. Three days later, the war in Europe ended.

==== Post-war assignments ====
After the end of hostilities, Winters remained in Europe as the process of occupation and demobilization began. Even though he had enough points to return to the United States, he was told that he was needed in Germany. Later, he was offered a regular (non-reserve) commission, but declined it. He finally embarked from Marseille aboard the Wooster Victory on 4 November 1945. He was separated from the Army on November 29, 1945, although he was not officially discharged until January 22, 1946, and he remained on terminal leave until then.

Winters was recommended for the Medal of Honor for his leadership at Brécourt Manor, but instead received the U.S. Army's second-highest award for combat valor, the Distinguished Service Cross. After the release of the Band of Brothers television miniseries, Representative Tim Holden (D-PA) introduced a bill asking the President to grant the Medal, but the bill died in the House Armed Services Committee Subcommittee on Military Personnel in 2007.

=== Korean War ===
After his discharge from the Army, Winters worked as a production supervisor for his close wartime friend Captain Lewis Nixon at Nixon's family business, Nixon Nitration Works of Nixon, New Jersey (now Edison Township), rising to become general manager in 1950. On May 16, 1948, Winters married Ethel Estoppey and continued to pursue his education through the GI Bill, attending a number of business and personnel management courses at Rutgers University. In 1951, he and his wife bought a small farm where later they built a home and raised two children.

In June 1951, Winters was recalled to active duty in the Army during the Korean War. He was ordered to join the 11th Airborne Division at Fort Campbell, Kentucky, but he was given six months to report and in this time he traveled to Washington, D.C., to speak to General Anthony McAuliffe, in the hope that he could convince the Army not to send him to Korea. He explained to McAuliffe that he had seen enough of war and apparently McAuliffe understood his position, but explained that he was needed because of his command experience. Winters then reported to Fort Dix, New Jersey, where he was assigned as a regimental planning and training officer.

While at Fort Dix, Winters became disillusioned with his job, finding that he had little enthusiasm for training officers who lacked discipline and did not attend their scheduled classes. As a result, he volunteered to attend Ranger School, where he passed and became a Ranger. He then received orders to deploy to Korea and traveled to Seattle, where, during pre-deployment administration, he was offered the option of resigning his commission, which he accepted.

== Later life ==
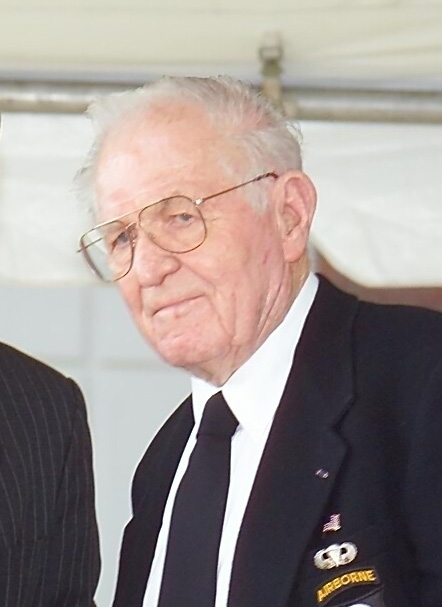
Winters in 2004

In 1972, Winters went into business for himself, starting his own company and selling animal feed products to farmers throughout Pennsylvania. Soon afterward, he moved his family to Hershey, Pennsylvania. He retired in 1997, aged 79.

During the 1990s, Winters was featured in a number of books and television series about his experiences and those of the men in Easy Company. In 1992, Stephen Ambrose wrote the book Band of Brothers: Easy Company, 506th Regiment, 101st Airborne from Normandy to Hitler's Eagle's Nest, which was subsequently turned into an HBO mini-series Band of Brothers, with Damian Lewis portraying Winters.

Winters also attended the 54th Primetime Emmy Awards on September 22, 2002 at the Shrine Auditorium in Los Angeles when the Band of Brothers miniseries was nominated in multiple categories. When it won Outstanding Miniseries (one of seven wins), Winters spoke at co-creator and executive producer Steven Spielberg's invitation on behalf of Easy Company while other surviving members of the company watched from the Los Angeles St. Regis Hotel.

I want to represent myself here as representing all the men of Company E that are present and accounted for and on behalf of all the men who have passed on before us. And we want to thank Steve Ambrose for listening to our stories and our memories and telling the story of Band of Brothers. We don't want to forget Tom Hanks, Steven Spielberg and his entire crew that did a wonderful job in telling our memories. And I also want to thank every one of you (Points at audience) for your support. I salute you! (Salutes)

Winters was the subject of the 2005 book Biggest Brother: The Life of Major Dick Winters, The Man Who Led the Band of Brothers, written by Larry Alexander. His own memoir, Beyond Band of Brothers: The War Memoirs of Major Dick Winters, co-written by military historian and retired U.S. Army Colonel Cole C. Kingseed, was published in early 2006. He also gave a number of lectures on leadership to cadets at the United States Military Academy at West Point.

On May 16, 2009, Franklin and Marshall College conferred an honorary doctorate in humane letters upon Winters.

Despite the many accolades he had received, Winters remained humble about his service. During an interview for Band of Brothers that was both the miniseries' final scene and included in the official HBO companion documentary We Stand Alone Together, Winters quoted a passage from a letter he received from Sergeant Myron "Mike" Ranney:

"I cherish the memories of a question my grandson asked me the other day when he said, 'Grandpa, were you a hero in the war?' Grandpa said 'No... but I served in a company of heroes'."

== Death ==
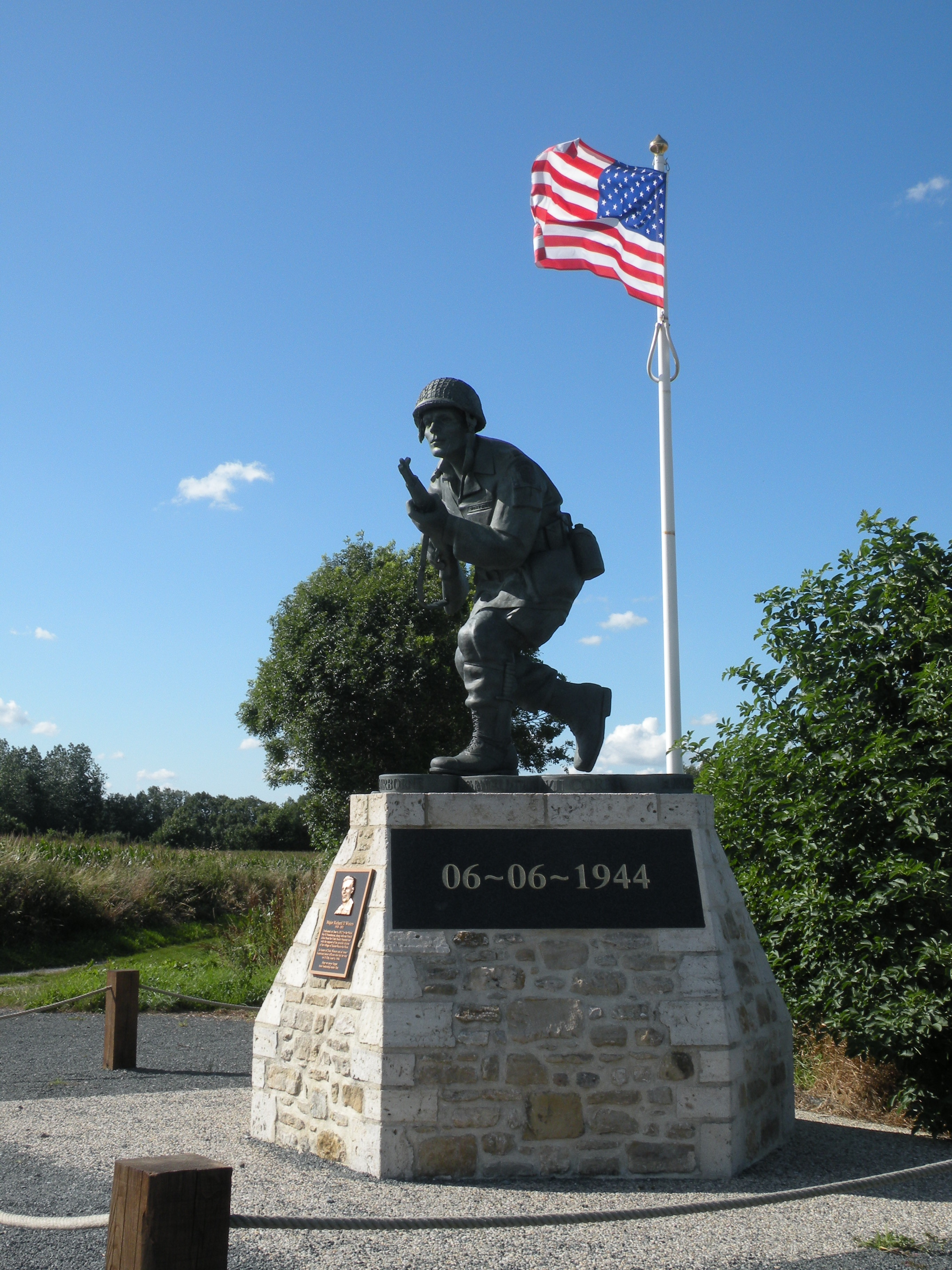
The Richard D. Winters Leadership Monument near Sainte-Marie-du-Mont, Normandy, France

Winters died on January 2, 2011, at an assisted living facility in Campbelltown, Pennsylvania, aged 92. He had suffered from Parkinson's disease for several years. Winters was buried in a private funeral service, which was held on January 8, 2011. He was buried in the Bergstrasse Evangelical Lutheran Church cemetery in Ephrata, Pennsylvania, next to his parents in the Winters' family plot. His grave is marked "Richard D. Winters, World War II 101st Airborne". His wife Ethel died on April 11, 2012 at Country Meadows, Hershey. She was 89 years old.

=== Memorials ===
On June 6, 2012, the 68th anniversary of the D-Day landings, the Richard D. Winters Leadership Monument, featuring a 12-foot (3.7 m) bronze statue of Winters by sculptor Stephen C. Spears was unveiled near the village of Sainte-Marie-du-Mont, France 49.3915°N 1.21345°W. Winters agreed for the statue to bear his resemblance on the condition that the monument would be dedicated to all junior officers who served and died during the Normandy landings. Among the attendees were World War II veterans, former Pennsylvania governor and first Secretary of Homeland Security Tom Ridge and Maj. Gen. James C. McConville, the 101st Airborne's commanding officer. During celebrations of the 70th anniversary of the landings in 2014, a party including Lewis, fellow Band of Brothers cast members Ross McCall (Technician 5th Grade Joseph Liebgott) and James Madio (Technician 4th Grade Frank Perconte) and Private 1st Class Jim "Pee Wee" Martin of G Company, 3rd Battalion of the 506th Parachute Infantry Regiment laid a wreath there.

A cast of the sculpture was placed in Ephrata, Pennsylvania, in a plaza on the Ephrata-to-Warwick linear trail park near Railroad Avenue and East Fulton Street, where Winters lived with his family from ages two to eight. That statue was dedicated on May 25, 2015.

Some of Winters' World War II uniforms and memorabilia are on display at two museums:

- December 44 Museum (Battle of the Bulge – La Gleize, Belgium)
- Gettysburg Museum of History (Gettysburg Pennsylvania)

In 2019, a US merchant vessel owned by Sealift Incorporated, was renamed the M/V Maj Richard Winters.
