= David Kenyon Webster =

American soldier/journalist (1922–1961)

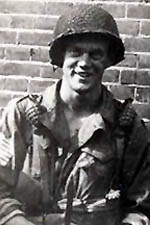
- Webster in Eindhoven during Operation Market Garden, 1944
- Born: June 2, 1922; New York City, U.S.
- Died: September 9, 1961 (aged 39): Pacific Ocean off Santa Monica, California, U.S.
- Occupations: Author; journalist
- Years active: 1945–1961
- Spouse: Barbara Stoessel (m. 1952)
- Children: 3
- Military service
- Allegiance: United States
- Branch: United States Army
- Service years: 1942–1945
- Rank: Private first class
- Unit: E Company, 2nd Battalion, 506th PIR, 101st Airborne Division
- Conflicts: World War II; Battle of Normandy; Operation Market Garden; Battle of the Nijmegen salient; Western Allied invasion of Germany
- Website: www.davidkenyonwebster.com

David Kenyon Webster (June 2, 1922 – September 9, 1961) was an American author and journalist. After serving as a soldier in the famed Easy Company, 2nd Battalion, 506th PIR of the 101st Airborne Division in World War II, Webster worked as a newspaperman and non-fiction writer.

Webster's war memoir, Parachute Infantry, was published posthumously and served as a key source for Stephen Ambrose's 1992 book Band of Brothers, a history of Easy Company. In the 2001 HBO miniseries, based on Ambrose's book, Webster was portrayed by Eion Bailey.

== Early life and education ==
Webster was born in New York City. He attended the Taft School in Watertown, Connecticut, where he wrestled, ran track, and was a member of the German club. He enrolled at Harvard University as an English major in 1940.

== Military service ==
In 1942, Webster left Harvard to volunteer for the U.S. Army paratroopers, joining the 506th Parachute Infantry Regiment, later attached to the 101st Airborne Division. He trained with Fox Company of the 2nd Battalion at Camp Toccoa, Georgia, and on D-Day, parachuted into Normandy as part of the 2nd Battalion's headquarters company. He landed in the wet fields behind Utah Beach and suffered a minor shrapnel wound from a German mortar shell. Disappointed with the lack of action in headquarters company, Webster transferred to Easy Company after the battle in Normandy ended.

In September 1944, Webster parachuted into the Netherlands during Operation Market Garden. After the operation failed to achieve its objective of seizing the bridges over the Rhine, the company shifted toward Arnhem. On October 5, the 506th PIR relieved the British 43rd Division during the Battle of the Nijmegen salient. During the attack in the no-man's land called "the Island," Webster was wounded in the leg by machine gun fire, the bullet passing cleanly through the flesh of his calf. Webster blurted out "they got me!" after being hit, something he was immediately embarrassed by, later writing that he had seen "too many movies."

After a long stint in the hospital, Webster rejoined Easy Company in late January 1945 in Haguenau, France. He found his exhausted, war-weary regiment decimated by combat in the Battle of the Bulge, and discovered that many of his friends were casualties. Later, after entering Germany, Easy Company helped liberate the Kaufering concentration camp complex.

== Writing career ==
After the war, Webster studied at the Bread Loaf Writers' Conference in Middlebury, Vermont. He worked as a reporter for The Wall Street Journal and the Los Angeles Daily News, as well as working in public relations for companies such as North American Aviation. In 1948, excerpts from his unpublished war memoirs were used in Leonard Rapport and Arthur Northwood Jr.'s Rendezvous with Destiny: A History of the 101st Airborne Division. In May 1952, The Saturday Evening Post published "We Drank Hitler's Champagne," Webster's account of the 506th PIR's occupation of Berchtesgaden. His writing also appeared in Infantry Journal, Graphic Arts Monthly, The Journal of Education, The Reporter, and The Army Combat Forces Journal. In December 1960, The Fort Campbell Courier published a brief excerpt of his still-unpublished memoirs, with the paper expecting the full work to be published soon thereafter.

Webster took up sailing and marine biology as hobbies, and his interest in sharks led him to write the non-fiction book Myth and Maneater: The Story of the Shark, which was published posthumously in 1962. At the time of his death, Webster was working as a technical writer for System Development Corporation.

== Personal life and death ==
In 1952, Webster married Barbara Stoessel, a Scripps College graduate, with whom he had three children.

On the morning of September 9, 1961, Webster embarked on a fishing trip off Santa Monica, California, in a twelve-foot (3.7 m) sailboat. When he failed to return that afternoon, the United States Coast Guard began a search for him. Early the following day, commercial fishermen recovered his boat five nautical miles (9.3 km; 5.8 mi) offshore with one oar and the tiller missing. Barbara told authorities that Webster often went shark fishing in the small craft but did not wear a life preserver. An Episcopal memorial service was held on October 7.

== Posthumous recognition and legacy ==
Historian Stephen Ambrose drew heavily from Webster's unpublished memoirs while writing his 1992 book Band of Brothers. Through Ambrose's influence, the memoirs were published by the Louisiana State University Press in 1994 as Parachute Infantry: An American Paratrooper's Memoir of D-Day and the Fall of the Third Reich. The book received critical acclaim, with The New York Times calling it "gutsy, sometimes bemused and sometimes angry," and Booklist saying that "Webster achieves a perfectly pitched, Sad Sack sarcasm that is an authentic witness to the combat experience."

Writing in the Chicago Tribune in 1994, reviewer Patrick T. Reardon wrote that Parachute Infantry "stands out among the forest of other books" appearing on the 50th anniversary of D-Day. Webster, he wrote, described "a war of complexity and ambiguity, far removed from the simplicity of slogans and propaganda," which was necessary "because the Nazis had to be stopped because they were killing millions of innocent people." Webster "also saw his fellow American soldiers shoot unarmed, wounded German prisoners". Webster also described how he was "ecstatic" that he received a "million-dollar wound" that would get him out of combat without permanently disabling him. Reardon wrote that such "gritty honesty" was not what publishers were seeking after the war, and prevented Webster from finding a publisher during his lifetime.

In Band of Brothers, Ambrose portrays Webster as educated and principled, yet grounded and reliable, a soldier unconcerned with military glory or advancement:

He had long ago made it a rule of his Army life never to do anything voluntarily. He was an intellectual, as much an observer and chronicler of the phenomenon of soldiering as a practitioner. He was almost the only original Toccoa man who never became an NCO. Various officers wanted to make him a squad leader, but he refused. He was there to do his duty, and he did it—he never let a buddy down in combat, in France, Holland, or Germany—but he never volunteered for anything and he spurned promotion.

In the 2001 HBO miniseries Band of Brothers, Webster was portrayed by actor Eion Bailey. The episode "The Last Patrol" is told from Webster's character's point of view.

After Webster's death, the Taft School established the David Kenyon Webster Prize for Excellence in Writing, given yearly to one of its students.

== See also ==
- List of people who disappeared at sea
