= Augusta Chiwy =

Belgian nurse (1921–2015)

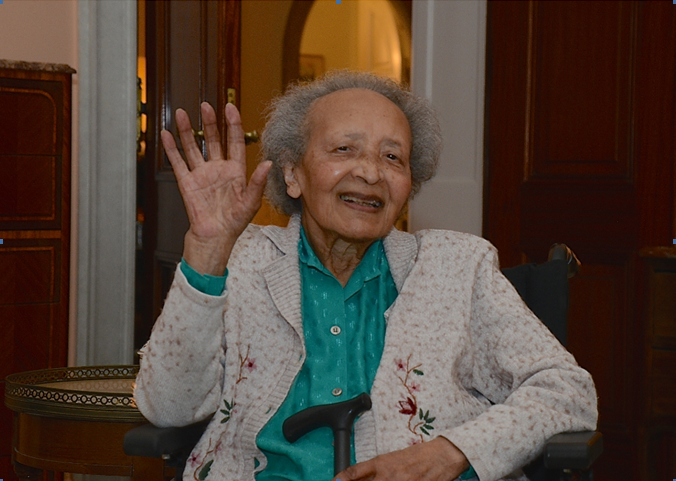
- Born: 6 June 1921 (Note: Some sources state Chiwy's date of birth to be 3 June 1921. Others cite 6 June 1921.); Belgian Congo
- Died: 23 August 2015 (aged 94); Belgium
- Occupation: Registered Nurse
- Known for: Serving as a volunteer nurse during the siege of Bastogne
- Awards: Order of the Crown (Belgium); Civilian Award for Humanitarian Service (USA)

Augusta Marie Chiwy (6 June 1921 – 23 August 2015) was a Belgian nurse who was a volunteer during the Siege of Bastogne in 1944. She worked with the U.S. Army physician John Prior and with fellow Belgian nurse Renée Lemaire, treating injured soldiers during the Battle of the Bulge.

== Biography ==
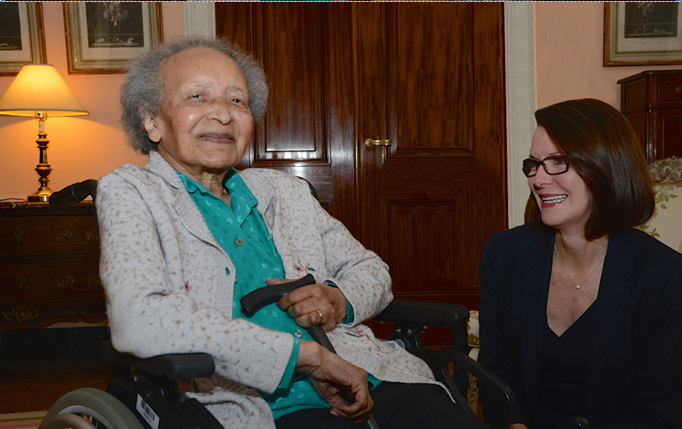
Augusta Chiwy with United States Ambassador to Belgium Denise Bauer

Chiwy, the daughter of a Belgian veterinarian from Bastogne and his Congolese wife, was born in 1921 in the Belgian Congo. She returned to Belgium at the age of nine. In 1940, aged 19, she went to Leuven to be trained as a nurse.

On 16 December 1944, the day the Germans launched their offensive, Chiwy returned to her family in Bastogne for Christmas. At that time the town seemed safely in American hands, but within days was surrounded by German troops advancing into Belgium during the Battle of the Bulge. Chiwy attended to civilian and military casualties with her uncle, a doctor, until 21 December, when she volunteered to serve as a nurse at the first-aid station of the 20th Armored Infantry Battalion, 10th Armored Division, commanded by John Prior. Chiwy worked at the aid station in the Rue Neufchateau, and even donned an Army uniform in order to go out into the field to collect the wounded while under fire.

On 24 December 1944, the first aid station was hit by a German bomb, killing over 30 wounded men and another volunteer nurse, Renée Lemaire. Chiwy was with Prior in an adjoining building and was blown through a wall, but survived unhurt. She continued to assist the American forces until the siege was finally lifted two days later.

After the war Chiwy worked at a hospital treating spinal injuries, married a Belgian soldier and had two children.

She rarely spoke of her experiences after the war, and it was assumed in some historical accounts of the battle that she had died there. British historian Martin King, while researching his book Voices of the Bulge, finally tracked her down in a retirement home near Brussels, hearing her story, and bringing her to public attention.

Stephen Ambrose makes a passing reference to her in his book Band of Brothers; a black nurse character briefly appears in the television series based on the book, and another nurse, portrayed by Rebecca Okot, explains that she is from the Belgian Congo.

In July 2015 a documentary film about Chiwy entitled Searching for Augusta: The Forgotten Angel of Bastogne, produced by Martin King and directed by Mike Edwards, won the Emmy Award for Historical Documentary.

== Death ==
Chiwy died on 23 August 2015 near Brussels, Belgium. She is buried at the cemetery in Bastogne.

== Awards ==
On 24 June 2011, Chiwy was appointed Knight of the Order of the Crown. The medal was presented on behalf of King Albert II of Belgium by Belgium's Minister of Defence Pieter De Crem. On 12 December 2011, Chiwy was awarded the Civilian Award for Humanitarian Service by the United States Department of the Army. It was presented to her by the U.S. Ambassador to Belgium Howard Gutman. On 21 March 2014, Chiwy was recognized by her hometown as a Bastogne Citizen of Honor.
