= Band of Brothers (miniseries) =

2001 American war drama miniseries

- Genre: War drama
- Created by: Tom Hanks; Steven Spielberg
- Based on: Band of Brothers by Stephen E. Ambrose
- Written by: Erik Jendresen; Tom Hanks; John Orloff; E. Max Frye; Graham Yost; Bruce C. McKenna; Erik Bork
- Directed by: Phil Alden Robinson; Richard Loncraine; Mikael Salomon; David Nutter; Tom Hanks; David Leland; David Frankel; Tony To
- Starring: Cast and characters
- Music by: Michael Kamen
- Country of origin: United States
- Original language: English
- No. of episodes: 10

Production
- Executive producers: Steven Spielberg; Tom Hanks
- Producers: Gary Goetzman; Tony To; Erik Bork; Erik Jendresen; Stephen E. Ambrose; Mary Richards
- Cinematography: Remi Adefarasin; Joel J. Ransom
- Editors: Billy Fox; Oral Norrie Ottey; Frances Parker; John Richards
- Running time: 49–70 minutes
- Production companies: Playtone; DreamWorks Television; HBO Entertainment
- Budget: $125 million

Original release
- Network: HBO
- Release: September 9 – November 4, 2001

Related
- The Pacific; Masters of the Air

Band of Brothers is a 2001 American war drama miniseries based on historian Stephen E. Ambrose's 1992 non-fiction book of the same name. It was created by Steven Spielberg and Tom Hanks, who also served as executive producers, and who had collaborated on the 1998 World War II film Saving Private Ryan, from which the series got many of its visual cues and crew members. Episodes first aired on HBO from September 9 to November 4, 2001.

The series dramatizes the history of "Easy" Company, 2nd Battalion, 506th Parachute Infantry Regiment of the 101st Airborne Division. It begins during Easy Company's paratrooper training and follows its participation in the Western Front of World War II from D-Day to their occupation of Berchtesgaden. The events are based on Ambrose's research and recorded interviews with Easy Company veterans. Although all the characters are based directly on members of Easy Company, the series took some literary license, adapting history for dramatic effect and series structure. Each episode begins with excerpts from interviews with some of the survivors, who are identified by name only at the end of the finale. The title of the book and series comes from the St. Crispin's Day speech in William Shakespeare's play Henry V, delivered by King Henry before the Battle of Agincourt. Ambrose quotes a passage from the speech on his book's first page; this passage is recited by Carwood Lipton in the series finale.

Band of Brothers received widespread acclaim and would go on to win the Primetime Emmy Award for Outstanding Miniseries. Retrospective reviews have cited it as one of the greatest television shows of all time, and it is widely seen as a pioneering entry in Peak TV in large part due to its high production value which many compared favorably to Saving Private Ryan. Its success led to the creation of two companion piece miniseries, also with Spielberg's and Hanks' involvement, that feature the exploits of other military branches during World War II: The Pacific (2010) and Masters of the Air (2024).

== Plot ==
Over the course of ten episodes, Band of Brothers depicts a dramatized account of Easy Company's (Note: The company is referred to as "Easy" after the radio call for "E" in the phonetic alphabet used during World War II.) exploits during World War II.

Episodes include their training at Camp Toccoa, the American airborne landings in Normandy, Operation Market Garden, the Siege of Bastogne, the invasion of Germany, the liberation of the Kaufering concentration camp, the taking of the Kehlsteinhaus (Eagle's Nest) in Berchtesgaden, the occupation of Germany, and finally the war's end.

Richard Winters is the central character, shown working to accomplish the company's missions and keep his men together and safe. While the series features a large ensemble cast, each episode generally focuses on a single character, following his action.

As the series is based on historical events, the fates of the characters reflect those of the people on whom they are based. Many either die or sustain serious wounds, which lead to their being sent home. Other soldiers recover after treatment in field hospitals and rejoin their units on the front line. Their experiences, and the moral, mental, and physical hurdles they must overcome, are central to the story's narrative.

It follows the story from their initial training starting in 1942 to the end of World War II. They parachuted behind enemy lines in the early hours of D-Day in support of the landings at Utah beach, participated in the liberation of Carentan, and again parachuted into action during Operation Market Garden. They also liberated a concentration camp and were the first to enter Hitler's mountain retreat in Berchtesgaden.

== Cast and characters ==
The series features a large ensemble cast.

=== Main cast ===
- Kirk Acevedo as Staff Sergeant Joe Toye
- Eion Bailey as Private First Class David Kenyon Webster
- Michael Cudlitz as Staff Sergeant Denver "Bull" Randleman
- Dale Dye as Colonel Robert Sink
- Rick Gomez as Technician Fourth Grade George Luz
- Scott Grimes as Technical Sergeant Donald Malarkey
- Frank John Hughes as Staff Sergeant William "Wild Bill" Guarnere
- Damian Lewis as Major Richard "Dick" Winters
- Ron Livingston as Captain Lewis Nixon
- James Madio as Technician Fourth Grade Frank Perconte
- Neal McDonough as First Lieutenant Lynn "Buck" Compton
- Rene L. Moreno as Technician Fifth Grade Joseph Ramirez
- David Schwimmer as Captain Herbert Sobel
- Richard Speight, Jr. as Sergeant Warren "Skip" Muck
- Donnie Wahlberg as Second Lieutenant Carwood Lipton
- Matthew Settle as Captain Ronald Speirs
- Douglas Spain as Technician Fifth Grade Antonio C. Garcia
- Rick Warden as First Lieutenant Harry Welsh
- Marc Warren as Private Albert Blithe
- Shane Taylor as Technician Fourth Grade Eugene "Doc" Gilbert Roe
- Dexter Fletcher as Staff Sergeant John "Johnny" Martin
- Colin Hanks as First Lieutenant Henry S. Jones
- Ross McCall as Technician Fifth Grade Joseph Liebgott

=== Recurring cast ===
- Nicholas Aaron as Private First Class Robert "Popeye" Wynn
- Doug Allen as Private Alton More
- Jamie Bamber as Second Lieutenant Jack E. Foley
- Philip Barantini as Private Wayne A. "Skinny" Sisk
- George Calil as Sergeant James "Moe" Alley Jr.
- Ben Caplan as Corporal Walter 'Smokey' Gordon
- Michael Fassbender as Technical Sergeant Burton Christenson
- Craig Heaney as Private Roy W. Cobb
- Nolan Hemmings as Staff Sergeant Chuck Grant
- Peter Youngblood Hills as Staff Sergeant Darrell "Shifty" Powers
- Mark Huberman as Private Lester A. Hashey
- Robin Laing as Private First Class Edward "Babe" Heffron
- Mark Lawrence as Corporal William Dukeman
- Matthew Leitch as Staff Sergeant Floyd Talbert
- Rocky Marshall as Staff Sergeant Earl McClung
- Tim Matthews as Private First Class Alex Penkala
- Peter McCabe as Corporal Donald Hoobler
- Phil McKee as Lieutenant Colonel Robert L. Strayer

==== Supporting ====
- David Andrews as Major General Elbridge G. Chapman
- Bill Armstrong as Brigadier General Anthony McAuliffe
- Jonie Broom as Hans Schmidt
- Doug Cockle as Father John Maloney
- Alexis Conran as George Lavenson
- Dominic Cooper as Allington
- Marcos D'Cruze as Joseph P. Domingus
- Tony Devlin as Ralph R. "Doc" Spina
- Jimmy Fallon as Lt. George C. Rice
- Simon Fenton as Gerald J. Lorraine
- Iain Fletcher as Bernard J. "Doc" Ryan
- Tom George as Private White
- Ezra Godden as Robert van Klinken
- Stephen Graham as Sgt. Myron "Mike" Ranney
- Luke Griffin as Terrence C. "Salty" Harris
- Tom Hardy as Private John Janovec
- Matt Hickey as Private Patrick O'Keefe
- Andrew Howard as Captain Clarence Hester
- Nigel Hoyle as Staff Sergeant Leo Boyle
- Lucie Jeanne as Renée Lemaire
- Corey Johnson as Regimental Doctor, Major Louis Kent
- Marc Ryan-Jordan as John T. Julian
- Wolf Kahler as German General
- John Light as Lieutenant Colonel David Dobie (Note: The Band of Brothers book refers to Dobie as Col. O. Dobey, which is how he is named in the credits.)
- Joseph May as Edward J. Shames
- James McAvoy as Pvt. James W. Miller
- Stephen McCole as Frederick T. "Moose" Heyliger
- Hugo Metsers as John van Kooijk
- Benjamin Montague as Private Matt McDowell
- Hans Georg Nenning as German Baker
- David Nicolle as First Lieutenant Thomas Peacock
- Kieran O'Brien as Private Allen Vest
- Rebecca Okot as Anna the Nurse
- Jason O'Mara as First Lieutenant Thomas Meehan III
- Peter O'Meara as First Lieutenant Norman Dike
- Oscar Pearce as Richard H. Hughes
- Simon Pegg as First Sergeant William S. Evans
- Ben Peyton as Warrant Officer Hill
- Andrew Lee Potts as Eugene E. Jackson
- Dave Power as Rudolph R. Dittrich
- Luke Roberts as Herbert J. Suerth
- Iain Robertson as George Smith
- Toby Ross Bryant as Medic Paul Jones
- Bart Ruspoli as Private Edward Tipper
- Alex Sagba as Francis J. Mellet
- Simon Schatzberger as Private First Class Joseph Lesniewski
- Andrew Scott as Private John "Cowboy" Hall
- Graham Seed as Brigadier General Red Beret
- Adam Sims as John S. Zielinski, Jr.
- Anatole Taubman as Otto Herzfeld
- Stephen Walters as Technician Fifth Grade John "Jack" McGrath, Sr.
- Jack Wouterse as a Dutch farmer in a barn
- Paul Williams as Private Jack Olsen
- Jonathan Young as Lieutenant John W. Kelley

== Episodes ==
No.	Title	Directed by	Written by	Main character(s)	Original release date	US viewers (millions)
1	"Currahee"	Phil Alden Robinson	Teleplay by : Erik Jendresen and Tom Hanks	Richard Winters and Herbert Sobel	September 9, 2001	9.90
In 1942, Easy Company goes through parachute training at Camp Toccoa under First Lieutenant Herbert Sobel, a strict disciplinarian who goes out of his way to find fault with his men. The company is shipped to England in September 1943, and as training progresses, Sobel's inadequacy as a leader in the field becomes evident. Following his promotion to captain, Sobel fabricates a dispute with Lieutenant Richard "Dick" Winters and gives him the option of accepting unwarranted punishment or trial by court martial. Winters surprises Sobel by rejecting the punishment and choosing the court-martial. These factors led Easy's non-commissioned officers to resign en masse. Colonel Robert Sink, the regiment's commander, reassigns Sobel to command a parachuting school for non-infantry personnel. With new leadership, Easy Company prepares for Operation Overlord.
2	"Day of Days"	Richard Loncraine	John Orloff	Richard Winters	September 9, 2001	9.90
On June 6, 1944, Easy Company parachutes into Normandy, but is scattered and many miles away from their designated drop zones. Most of Easy reconnects, but its company commander, Lieutenant Thomas Meehan, is missing. Winters assumes command and successfully leads a group in destroying German artillery emplacements firing on Utah Beach from Brécourt Manor. Winters also discovers a map of all German artillery emplacements in Normandy. Several of Easy's men earn combat decorations for their part in the attack, including Winters, who is awarded the Distinguished Service Cross.
3	"Carentan"	Mikael Salomon	E. Max Frye	Albert Blithe	September 16, 2001	7.27
Easy fights in the Battle of Carentan and loses several men. Rumors begin to circulate that Lieutenant Ronald Speirs killed a group of German prisoners. Private Albert Blithe, who has been struggling with shell shock, is finally spurred into action by Winters during the Battle of Bloody Gulch. Several days later, Blithe is shot through the neck by a sniper while on patrol. Note: The episode ends with the inaccurate statement that Blithe never recovered from his wounds and died in 1948. In reality, he recovered and continued to serve in the Army until he died in Germany as an active-duty serviceman in 1967.
4	"Replacements"	David Nutter	Graham Yost and Bruce C. McKenna	Denver "Bull" Randleman	September 23, 2001	6.29
Replacements join Easy Company and struggle to be accepted by the veterans who fought at Normandy. Winters is promoted to captain. Sobel is the regiment's new supply officer. The company parachutes into the Netherlands as part of Operation Market Garden and liberates Eindhoven. During combat in Nuenen, the replacements integrate themselves with the company, but Easy is forced to retreat. Denver "Bull" Randleman is left behind. Wounded, he hides in a barn and engages in close quarters combat with a German soldier. He is reunited with the rest of the company the following day.
5	"Crossroads"	Tom Hanks	Erik Jendresen	Richard Winters	September 30, 2001	6.13
Winters writes an after-action report on Easy's actions during a German counter offensive on the Nijmegen salient; he is troubled by the fact that he shot an unarmed, teenage Waffen-SS soldier during the battle. Winters is promoted to battalion executive officer, and command of Easy is given to "Moose" Heyliger. Easy Company assists Lieutenant Colonel David Dobie of the British 1st Airborne Division in Operation Pegasus to rescue 140 of his comrades. The operation succeeds, and the rescued British troops celebrate with Easy. Heyliger is injured in a friendly fire incident, and command of the company passes to Lieutenant Norman Dike before Easy is rushed to Bastogne to fight in the Battle of the Bulge.
6	"Bastogne"	David Leland	Bruce C. McKenna	Eugene Roe	October 7, 2001	6.42
Easy faces harsh winter conditions in the Ardennes, running dangerously low on supplies. Combat medic Eugene "Doc" Roe helps his fellow soldiers where he can, while also scrounging for supplies. He befriends a Belgian nurse named Renée. Easy and other American units are surrounded, but General McAuliffe, their commander, rejects a German demand to surrender.
7	"The Breaking Point"	David Frankel	Graham Yost	Carwood Lipton	October 14, 2001	6.43
Easy holds the line near Foy, Belgium, losing numerous soldiers, including Hoobler, who dies after accidentally shooting himself with a Luger pistol. Winters and the men worry about Norman Dike, who is frequently absent without explanation. First Sergeant Carwood Lipton attempts to keep Easy's morale up. Lieutenant Lynn "Buck" Compton watches in horror as his close friends William Guarnere and Joe Toye each lose a leg to shelling, and he too is pulled from the line. During the assault on Foy, Dike freezes up during an attack, so Winters orders Speirs to relieve him. Victorious but having taken heavy casualties, Easy takes shelter in a church, where Lipton is told he has been given a field commission as a second lieutenant, and Captain Speirs is officially assigned command of Easy.
8	"The Last Patrol"	Tony To	Erik Bork and Bruce C. McKenna	David Webster	October 21, 2001	5.95
In Haguenau, Easy adjusts to leaving the combat zone and gives a cold welcome to Private David Webster, who did not break out of the hospital to rejoin the company like others, and new replacement Second Lieutenant Henry Jones, fresh from West Point. Jones and Webster participate in a night raid across the river to get prisoners for interrogation, which gains them some respect. Winters is promoted to major, Lipton's commission becomes official, and Jones is promoted to first lieutenant and transferred to the regimental staff.
9	"Why We Fight"	David Frankel	John Orloff	Lewis Nixon	October 28, 2001	6.08
As Captain Lewis Nixon scrounges for his favored whisky, Vat 69, Easy Company enters Nazi Germany. Nixon is distraught after learning that his wife is divorcing him; he is demoted to operations officer for the battalion. A small patrol of Easy Company men stumble upon a concentration camp near Landsberg and free the surviving prisoners. Easy secures food for the survivors, but the regiment's surgeon warns of refeeding syndrome; the survivors have to remain in the camp so they can be monitored. The German locals deny knowing about the camp. The 101st Airborne's commander, General Taylor, imposes martial law and orders all able-bodied civilians from ages 14 to 80 to clean up the camp, including removing the bodies. Nixon informs Easy that Adolf Hitler has committed suicide.
10	"Points"	Mikael Salomon	Erik Jendresen and Erik Bork	Richard Winters	November 4, 2001	5.05
Easy captures the Eagle's Nest in Berchtesgaden without resistance, and the end of the war in Europe is announced. Finding a collection of alcoholic beverages in a cellar at Hermann Göring's house, Winters allows the company to celebrate before they travel to Austria to become an occupying force. It is then announced that the division will be redeployed to the Pacific Theater, but those with enough points will get to go home. General Taylor authorizes a drawing for each company to rotate one soldier home, and Staff Sergeant Shifty Powers wins Easy's drawing but is severely injured in an automobile accident on his way to the airfield. Private Liebgott leads a trio that tracks down and summarily executes a concentration camp commandant at a farm. Desiring to redeploy sooner, Winters applies for a transfer to the 13th Airborne, but is denied. Despite the war's end, Easy Company men continue to be injured or die. Easy oversees the surrender of 25,000 German troops in Zell am See. Over a company baseball game, Winters narrates the fates of some of the men. He interrupts the game to announce the surrender of the Empire of Japan, which ends the war, and then narrates Nixon's fate and finally his own. The episode concludes with interviews with actual surviving Easy Company members, where they are named onscreen for the first time.
Special
–	"We Stand Alone Together"	Mark Cowen	William Richter	Easy Company real-life members	November 10, 2001	–
Subtitled The Men of Easy Company, an official companion documentary included on home video for the miniseries and available on streaming services. Consists of interviews with the surviving real-life members of Easy Company, including Winters, Lipton, Guarnere, Heffron, and Powers, and also photos and video from and related to their service and their annual reunions. Also includes Guarnere and Heffron revisiting Foy and interviews with Easy Company members' families.

== Production ==
The series was developed chiefly by Tom Hanks and Erik Jendresen, who spent months detailing the plot outline and individual episodes. Steven Spielberg served as "the final eye" and used Saving Private Ryan, the film on which he and Hanks had collaborated, to inform the series, although Jendresen served as showrunner. Accounts of Easy Company veterans, such as Donald Malarkey, were incorporated into production to add historic detail.

=== Budget and promotion ===
A promotional poster for Band of Brothers

Band of Brothers was at the time the most expensive TV miniseries to have been made by any network. Its budget was about $125 million, or an average of $12.5 million per episode.

An additional $15 million was allocated for a promotional campaign, which included screenings for World War II veterans. One was held at Utah Beach, Normandy, where U.S. troops had landed on June 6, 1944. On June 7, 2001, 47 Easy Company veterans were flown to Paris and then traveled by chartered train to the site, where the series premiered. Chrysler was a sponsor, as its Jeeps were used in the series. Chrysler spent $5 million to $15 million on its advertising campaign, using footage from Band of Brothers. Each of the spots was reviewed and approved by the co-executive producers Hanks and Spielberg.

The BBC paid £7 million ($10.1 million) as co-production partner, the most it had ever paid for a bought-in program, and screened it on BBC Two. Originally, it was to have aired on BBC One but was moved to allow an "uninterrupted ten-week run", with the BBC denying that this was because the series was not sufficiently mainstream. Negotiations were monitored by British Prime Minister Tony Blair, who spoke personally to Spielberg.

=== Location ===
The series was shot over eight to ten months primarily at Ellenbrook Fields, at Hatfield Aerodrome in Hertfordshire, England. This location had been used to shoot the film Saving Private Ryan. Various sets were built, including replicas on the large open field of 12 European towns, among them Bastogne, Belgium; Eindhoven, Netherlands; and Carentan, France. North Weald Airfield in Essex was used for shots depicting the take-offs for the D-Day Normandy landings. The village of Hambleden, in Buckinghamshire, England, was used extensively in the early episodes to depict the company's training in England, as well as in later scenes.

The scenes set in Germany and Austria were shot in Switzerland, in and near the village of Brienz in the Bernese Oberland, and at the nearby Grandhotel Giessbach.

=== Historical accuracy ===
To preserve historical accuracy, the writers conducted additional research. One source was the memoir of Easy Company soldier David Kenyon Webster, Parachute Infantry: An American Paratrooper's Memoir of D-Day and the Fall of the Third Reich (1994). This was published by LSU Press, following renewed interest in World War II and more than 30 years after his death in a boating accident. In Band of Brothers Ambrose quoted liberally from Webster's unpublished diary entries, with permission from his estate. (Note: Webster is referenced 18 times in the index, and appears on 69 pages.)

The production team consulted Dale Dye, a retired United States Marine Corps captain and consultant on Saving Private Ryan, as well as with most of the surviving Easy Company veterans, including Richard Winters, Bill Guarnere, Frank Perconte, Ed Heffron, and Amos Taylor. Dye (who portrays Colonel Robert Sink) instructed the actors in a 10-day boot camp at the Longmoor Military Camp in Hampshire, culminating with parachute training at RAF Brize Norton.

The production aimed for accuracy in the details of weapons and costumes. Simon Atherton, the weapons master, corresponded with veterans to match weapons to scenes, and assistant costume designer Joe Hobbs used photos and veteran accounts.

Most actors had contact with the individuals they were to portray before filming, often by telephone. Several veterans came to the production site. Hanks acknowledged that alterations were needed to create the series: "We've made history fit onto our screens. We had to condense down a vast number of characters, fold other people's experiences into 10 or 15 people, and have people saying and doing things others said or did. We had people take off their helmets to identify them, when they would never have done so in combat. But I still think it is three or four times more accurate than most films like this." As a final accuracy check, the veterans saw previews of the series and approved the episodes before they were aired.

Shortly after the premiere of the series, Tom Hanks asked Major Winters what he thought of Band of Brothers. The major responded, "I wish that it had been more authentic. I was hoping for an 80 percent solution." Hanks responded, "Look, Major, this is Hollywood. At the end of the day, we will be hailed as geniuses if we get this 12 percent right. We are going to shoot for 17 percent."

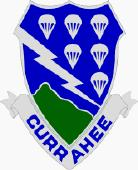
The 506th PIR Unit emblem

The liberation of one of the Kaufering subcamps of Dachau was depicted in episode 9 ("Why We Fight"); however, the 101st Airborne Division arrived at Kaufering Lager IV subcamp on the day after it was discovered by the 134th Ordnance Maintenance Battalion of the 12th Armored Division, on April 27, 1945. German historian and Holocaust researcher Anton Posset worked with Steven Spielberg and Tom Hanks as a consultant, providing photographs of the liberators and documentation of the survivors' reports he had collected over the years. The camp was reconstructed in England for the miniseries.

It is uncertain which Allied unit was first to reach the Kehlsteinhaus. Several claim the honor, compounded by confusion with the town of Berchtesgaden, which was taken on May 4 by forward elements of the 7th Infantry Regiment of the 3rd Infantry Division. (Note: According to Dwight D. Eisenhower, Supreme Commander of Allied forces in Europe, the 3rd Infantry Division was the first to take the town of Berchtesgaden; the "Eagle's Nest" is never mentioned. General Maxwell D. Taylor, former Commanding General of the 101st Airborne Division, then attached to the XXI Corps, agreed.) Reputedly, members of the 7th went as far as the elevator to the Kehlsteinhaus, with at least one individual claiming he and a partner continued on to the top. However, the 101st Airborne maintains it was first to both Berchtesgaden and the Kehlsteinhaus. Elements of the French 2nd Armored Division, Laurent Touyeras, Georges Buis and Paul Répiton-Préneuf, were present on the night of May 4 to 5, and took several photographs before leaving on May 10 at the request of US command, and this is supported by testimonies of the Spanish soldiers who went along with them.

Major Dick Winters, who commanded the 2nd Battalion of the U.S. 506th PIR in May 1945, stated that they entered Berchtesgaden shortly after noon on May 5. He challenged competing claims, stating, "If the 7th Infantry Regiment of the 3rd Division was first in Berchtesgaden, just where did they go? Berchtesgaden is a relatively small community. I walked into the Berchtesgaden Hof with Lieutenant Welsh and saw nobody other than some servants. Goering's Officers' Club and wine cellar certainly would have caught the attention of a French soldier from LeClerc's 2nd Armored Division, or a rifleman from the U.S. 3rd Division. I find it hard to imagine, if the 3rd Division was there first, why they left those beautiful Mercedes staff cars untouched for our men."

=== Soundtrack ===
Band of Brothers - Original Motion Picture Soundtrack

Soundtrack album by Michael Kamen
- Released: 2001
- Studios: Abbey Road; AIR Lyndhurst; Sony Music; Watford Town Hall
- Genre: Orchestral
- Length: 69:35
- Label: Sony Classical
- Producers: Michael Kamen; James Brett; Michael Price

The score was composed by Michael Kamen, his final television composition before his death in 2003. The arrangement was conducted by Kamen and performed by the London Metropolitan Orchestra.

No.	Title	Writer(s)	Length
1.	"Main Titles"	Michael Kamen	2:25
2.	"Band of Brothers - Suite One"	Kamen	6:32
3.	"Band of Brothers - Suite Two"	Kamen	9:14
4.	"The Mission Begins"	Kamen	5:50
5.	"Swamp"	Kamen	2:09
6.	"Spier's Speech"	Kamen	1:01
7.	"Fire on Lake"	Kamen	2:16
8.	"Parapluie"	Kamen	2:18
9.	"Boy Eats Chocolate"	Kamen	1:17
10.	"Bull's Theme"	Kamen	3:19
11.	"Winters on Subway"	Kamen	1:55
12.	"Headscarf"	Kamen	4:11
13.	"Buck in Hospital"	Kamen	2:00
14.	"Plaisir d'amour"	Kamen	1:55
15.	"Preparing for Patrol"	Kamen	2:29
16.	"String Quartet in C-sharp minor, Op. 131" (performed by The Con Tempo)	Ludwig van Beethoven	2:11
17.	"Discovery of the Camp"	Kamen	10:59
18.	"Nixon's Walk"	Kamen	2:15
19.	"Austria"	Kamen	2:00
20.	"Band of Brothers - Requiem" (vocals by Zoe Kamen and Máire Brennan)	Kamen	3:19

== Reception ==
=== Critical reception ===
Band of Brothers has a 94% approval rating on Rotten Tomatoes, with an average rating of 8.1/10 and based on 34 reviews. The website's critics consensus reads: "Band of Brothers offers a visceral, intense look at the horrors of war – and the sacrifices of the millions of ordinary people who served." Metacritic, which uses a weighted average, gives the miniseries a score of 87 out of 100 based on 28 reviews, indicating "universal acclaim".

CNN's Paul Clinton said that the miniseries "is a remarkable testament to that generation of citizen soldiers, who responded when called upon to save the world for democracy and then quietly returned to build the nation that we now all enjoy, and all too often take for granted". Caryn James of The New York Times called it "an extraordinary 10-part series that masters its greatest challenge: it balances the ideal of heroism with the violence and terror of battle, reflecting what is both civilized and savage about war." James also remarked on the generation gap between most viewers and characters, suggesting this was a significant hurdle. Robert Bianco of USA Today wrote that the series was "significantly flawed and yet absolutely extraordinary—just like the men it portrays," rating the series four out of four stars. He noted, however, that it was hard to identify with individual characters during crowded battle scenes.

Philip French of The Guardian commented that he had "seen nothing in the cinema this past year that impressed me as much as BBC2's 10-part Band of Brothers, produced by Steven Spielberg and Tom Hanks, and Ken Loach's The Navigators on Channel 4", and that it was "one of the best films ever made about men in war and superior in most ways to Saving Private Ryan." Matt Seaton, also in The Guardian, wrote that the film's production was "on such a scale that in an ad hoc, inadvertent way it gives one a powerful sense of what really was accomplished during the D-Day invasion - the extraordinary logistical effort of moving men and matériel in vast quantities."

Tom Shales of The Washington Post wrote that though the series is "at times visually astonishing," it suffers from "disorganization, muddled thinking and a sense of redundancy." Shales observed that the characters are hard to identify: "Few of the characters stand out strikingly against the backdrop of the war. In fact, this show is all backdrop and no front drop. When you watch two hours and still aren't quite sure who the main characters are, something is wrong."

Band of Brothers has become a benchmark for World War II series. The German series Generation War, for example, was characterized by critics as Band of Brüder (the German word for "Brothers").

=== Ratings ===
Band of Brothers' September 9, 2001 premiere drew almost ten million viewers. Two days later, the September 11 attacks occurred, and HBO immediately ceased its marketing campaign. The third episode drew 7.2 million viewers and the last episode received almost 5.1 million viewers, the smallest audience.

=== Awards and nominations ===
The series was nominated for 20 Primetime Emmy Awards and won seven, including Outstanding Miniseries and Outstanding Directing for a Miniseries, Movie, or Dramatic Special. It also won the Golden Globe Award for Best Miniseries or Motion Picture Made for Television, American Film Institute Award for TV Movie or Miniseries of the Year, Producers Guild of America Award for Outstanding Producer of Long-Form Television, and the TCA Award for Outstanding Achievement in Movies, Miniseries, and Specials.

The show was selected for a Peabody Award for "relying on both history and memory to create a new tribute to those who fought to preserve liberty." In September 2019, The Guardian ranked the show 68th on its list of the 100 best TV shows of the 21st century, stating that it "expanded the horizons – and budgets – of prestige TV".

==== Primetime Emmy Awards ====
Category	Nominee(s)	Episode	Result
Outstanding Miniseries	Steven Spielberg, Tom Hanks, Gary Goetzman, Tony To, Stephen E. Ambrose, Eric Bork, Eric Jendresen, Mary Richards		Won
Outstanding Achievement in Interactive Television Programming			Won
Outstanding Art Direction for a Miniseries or Movie	Anthony Pratt, Dom Dossett, Alan Tomkins, Kevin Philpps, Desmond Crowe, Malcolm Stone	"The Breaking Point"	Nominated
Outstanding Casting for a Miniseries, Movie, or Special	Meg Liberman, Camille H. Patton, Angela Terry, Gary Davy, Suzanne M. Smith		Won
Outstanding Cinematography for a Miniseries or a Movie	Remi Adefarasin	"The Last Patrol"	Nominated
Outstanding Directing for a Miniseries, Movie, or Dramatic Special	David Frankel, Tom Hanks, David Nutter, David Leland, Richard Loncraine, Phil Alden Robinson, Mikael Salomon, Tony To		Won
Outstanding Hairstyling for a Miniseries, Movie or a Special	Helen Smith & Paula Price	"Crossroads"	Nominated
Outstanding Main Title Design	Michael Riley, Michelle Dougherty, Jeff Miller, Jason Web		Nominated
Outstanding Makeup for a Miniseries, Movie or a Special (Non-Prosthetic)	Liz Tagg & Nikita Rae	"Why We Fight"	Nominated
Outstanding Makeup for a Miniseries, Movie or a Special (Prosthetic)	Daniel Parker, Matthew Smith, Duncan Jarman	"Day of Days"	Nominated
Outstanding Single Camera Picture Editing for a Miniseries, Movie or a Special	Frances Parker	"Day of Days"	Won
Outstanding Single Camera Picture Editing for a Miniseries, Movie or a Special	Billy Fox	"Replacements"	Nominated
Outstanding Sound Editing for a Miniseries, Movie, or Special	Campbell Askew, Paul Conway, James Boyle, Ross Adams, Andy Kennedy, Howard Halsall, Robert Gavin, Grahame Peters, Michael Higham, Dashiell Rae, Andie Derrick, Peter Burgis	"Day of Days"	Won
Outstanding Single Camera Sound Mixing for a Miniseries or a Movie	Colin Charles, Mike Dowson, Mark Taylor	"Carentan"	Won
Outstanding Single Camera Sound Mixing for a Miniseries or a Movie	David Stephenson, Mike Dowson, Mark Taylor	"Day of Days"	Nominated
Outstanding Single Camera Sound Mixing for a Miniseries or a Movie	Colin Charles, Keven Patrick Burns, Todd Orr	"The Breaking Point"	Nominated
Outstanding Special Visual Effects for a Miniseries, Movie or a Special	Angus Bickerton, John Lockwood, Ken Dailey, Joe Pavlo, Mark Nettleton, Michael Mulholland, Joss Williams, Nigel Stone	"Replacements"	Nominated
Outstanding Special Visual Effects for a Miniseries, Movie or a Special	Angus Bickerton, Mat Beck, Cindy Jones, Louis Mackall, Nigel Stone, Karl Mooney, Laurent Hugueniot, Chas Cash	"Day of Days"	Nominated
Outstanding Stunt Coordination	Greg Powell	"Carentan"	Nominated
Outstanding Writing for a Miniseries, Movie, or Dramatic Special	Erik Bork, E. Max Frye, Tom Hanks, Erik Jendresen, Bruce C. McKenna, John Orloff, Graham Yost		Nominated

==== Golden Globe Awards ====
Category	Nominee	Outcome
Best Miniseries or Television Film		Won
Best Actor in a Miniseries or Television Film	Damian Lewis	Nominated
Best Supporting Actor in a Series, Miniseries, or Television Film	Ron Livingston	Nominated

== Home media ==
The miniseries was released on VHS and DVD box sets on November 5, 2002. The DVD set has five discs containing all ten episodes, and a bonus disc including We Stand Alone Together: The Men of Easy Company and an official video diary by Ron Livingston (Lewis Nixon) showing the actors' boot camp at Longmoor. A collector's edition of the box set was also released, containing the same discs in a tin case instead of cardboard. As of 2010, Band of Brothers was one of the best-selling TV DVD sets, having sold about $250 million worth.

The series was released as an exclusive HD DVD TV series in Japan in 2007. With the demise of the format, they went out of production. A Blu-ray Disc version of Band of Brothers was released on November 11, 2008, and has become a Blu-ray Disc top seller.

== Related projects and commemorations ==
=== He Has Seen War (2011) ===
In 2011, HBO aired a documentary entitled He Has Seen War with Tom Hanks as executive producer and Mark Herzog as director about the postwar stories of and lasting effects of the war, including post-traumatic stress disorder, on not only Easy Company members but also members of the 1st Marine Division who were subjects of The Pacific after the division fought at Guadalcanal, Cape Gloucester, Peleliu, Iwo Jima and Okinawa. William "Wild Bill" Guarnere and Donald Malarkey both appear alongside their families, as does the family of Lynn "Buck" Compton and also the families of Corporal Eugene Sledge and Private Robert Leckie, two of the members of the 1st Marine Division who are central characters in The Pacific.

=== Dick Winters: Hang Tough (2012) ===
In 2012, the Richard D. Winters Leadership Monument near Sainte-Marie-du-Mont in Normandy, recognizing all American junior officers, together with their divisions and corps, who led the way on D-Day, was unveiled on the 68th anniversary of the invasion. For the occasion, the World War II Foundation, which raised the funds for the monument, produced a biographical documentary entitled Dick Winters: Hang Tough. Damian Lewis, who played Winters, narrates the film in the American accent he used while playing him. Documentary filmmaker and World War II Foundation founder and president Tim Gray is the creator of the overall film, which includes actual photos, photos from the miniseries and interviews with the real-life Winters and other Easy Company members including a number who were portrayed in the show such as Guarnere, Malarkey, Edward "Babe" Heffron, Frank Perconte and Edward Tipper.

Special attention was paid to the Brécourt Manor Assault including the owners of Brécourt Manor to this day — the Vallavieille family, including Utah Beach Museum founder Michel de Vallavieille, who was wounded after being mistaken for a German soldier — and the creation of the 13-foot (4.0 m) bronze statue of Winters by sculptor Steven Spears.

=== Band of Brothers limited podcast (2021) ===
In 2021, on the occasion of the miniseries' 20th anniversary, HBO produced an official podcast hosted by British-American author, broadcaster, and filmmaker Roger Bennett of the Men in Blazers soccer show and podcast. After a prologue episode featuring Tom Hanks as executive producer, it progresses through each episode, giving a summary before interviewing actors and crew members about their roles, their careers leading up to the miniseries, their experiences with the show, and the specific episode.

Podcast episode list
No.	Episode/Topic	Guest(s)
0	Prologue	Tom Hanks (Executive producer)
1	"Currahee"	Ron Livingston (Lewis Nixon)
2	"Day of Days"	John Orloff (Writer, Episodes 2 and 9) and Richard Loncraine (Director, Episode 2)
3	"Carentan"	Capt. Dale Dye (Robert Sink / Senior military advisor) and Matthew Settle (Ronald Speirs)
4	"Replacements"	Frank John Hughes (William "Wild Bill" Guarnere)
5	"Crossroads"	Erik Jendresen (Supervising producer / Lead writer)
6	"Bastogne"	Shane Taylor (Eugene "Doc" Roe)
7	"The Breaking Point"	Donnie Wahlberg (Carwood Lipton)
8	"The Last Patrol"	Scott Grimes (Donald Malarkey)
9	"Why We Fight"	Ross McCall (Joseph Liebgott) and John Orloff
10	"Points"	Damian Lewis (Richard "Dick" Winters)

=== Band of Brothers: Legacy (2026) ===
In 2026, HBO announced Band of Brothers: Legacy, a feature-length documentary marking the miniseries' 25th anniversary. Directed by former Green Beret Chase Millsap, it includes new interviews with cast members including David Schwimmer, Damian Lewis, Ron Livingston and Michael Cudlitz. The documentary was scheduled for release on HBO Max on September 9, 2026, the 25th anniversary of the miniseries' premiere.

=== Reunion and commemoration events ===
The cast reported forming deep bonds with each other personally during filming, and Cudlitz said in a 2021 interview that he hosts a reunion each year at his home in Los Angeles, saying "Whoever is in town shows up."

In 2022, the National WWII Museum in New Orleans hosted a symposium event to belatedly commemorate the 20th anniversary of the release of Band of Brothers, with many of the series' main cast members, producers, directors, screenwriters, and other team members speaking on various topics related to the series. The museum hosted another symposium in 2026 to commemorate the series' 25th anniversary.

== See also ==
- The Pacific
- Masters of the Air
- Battleground, a 1949 film that followed a company of the 327th Glider Infantry Regiment, 101st Airborne Division during the siege of Bastogne.
- Generation War, a German miniseries about the lives of four Wehrmacht soldiers
- List of Primetime Emmy Awards received by HBO
