= William Guarnere =

US Army soldier

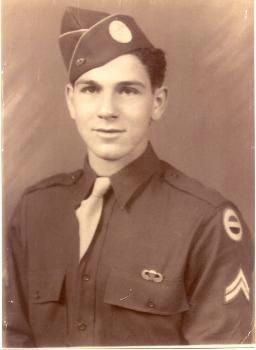
- Corporal Guarnere at Camp Toccoa, Georgia
- Born: April 28, 1923; Philadelphia, Pennsylvania, U.S.
- Died: March 8, 2014 (aged 90); Philadelphia, Pennsylvania, U.S.
- Relatives: Frances (wife); Henry (brother, deceased-1944); Eugene and William Jr (sons)
- Military career
- Allegiance: United States
- Branch: United States Army
- Service years: 1942–1945
- Rank: Staff Sergeant
- Nicknames: Wild Bill
- Units: Easy Company, 2nd Battalion, 506th Parachute Infantry Regiment, 101st Airborne Division
- Conflicts: World War II; Battle of Normandy; Operation Market Garden; Battle of the Bulge (WIA)
- Awards: Silver Star; Purple Heart
- Other work: Author, veterans organization member

William J. Guarnere Sr. (April 28, 1923 – March 8, 2014) was a United States Army paratrooper who fought in World War II as a non-commissioned officer with Easy Company, 2nd Battalion, 506th Parachute Infantry Regiment, in the 101st Airborne Division.

Guarnere wrote Brothers in Battle, Best of Friends: Two WWII Paratroopers from the Original Band of Brothers Tell Their Story with long-time friend Edward "Babe" Heffron and journalist Robyn Post in 2007. Guarnere was portrayed in the 2001 HBO miniseries Band of Brothers by Frank John Hughes.

== Early life and education ==
Guarnere was born in South Philadelphia, Pennsylvania, on April 28, 1923. He was the youngest of 10 children born to Joseph and Augusta Guarnere, who were of Italian origin. He participated in the Citizens Military Training Camp (CMTC) program during the Great Depression, gaining entrance at age 15 because his mother told the government her son was seventeen, the required age. He spent three summers in the CMTC, which normally took four years to complete, planning to graduate and apply for a commission as an officer in the United States Army. However, after his third year, the program was canceled due to the war in Europe.

Following the attack on Pearl Harbor, and six months before he was due to graduate from South Philadelphia High School, Guarnere dropped out and went to work for Baldwin Locomotive Works, which manufactured Sherman tanks for the Army. This upset his mother, because none of her other children had graduated from high school. Guarnere switched to the night shift and returned to school, earning his diploma in 1942. Because of his work, he had an exemption from military service. However, on 31 August 1942, Guarnere enlisted in the military and started training at Camp Toccoa, Georgia.

== Military service ==
Guarnere was assigned to Easy Company, 2nd Battalion, 506th Parachute Infantry Regiment, 101st Airborne Division. He made his first combat jump on D-Day as part of the Allied invasion of France.

Guarnere earned the nickname "Wild Bill" because of his reckless attitude towards the enemy. He displayed strong hatred for the Germans as his older brother Henry Guarnere had been killed fighting in the Italian campaign at Monte Cassino serving as a medic with the 1st Armored Division.

In the early hours of June 6, Guarnere joined then-First Lieutenant Richard Winters and a few others trying to secure the small village of Sainte-Marie-du-Mont and the exit of causeway number 2 leading from the beach. As they headed south, they heard a German platoon coming to bring supplies and took up ambush positions. Winters told the men to wait for his order to fire, but Guarnere, claiming he thought Winters might be hesitant to kill, opened fire immediately with his Thompson submachine gun, killing most of the unit.

Later that morning, Guarnere also joined Winters in assaulting a group of four 105 mm guns at Brécourt Manor. Winters named Guarnere as 2nd platoon's sergeant as the 13 paratroopers came up against about 50 German soldiers. The attack was later used as an example of how a small squad could attack a vastly larger force in a defensive position.

Guarnere was wounded in mid-October 1944, while Easy Company was securing the line on "The Island" on the south side of the Rhine River. He had to go up and down the line to check on and encourage his men, who were spread out over a distance of about a mile. He stole a motorcycle from a Dutch farmer and rode it across an open field, where he was shot in the right leg by a sniper. The impact knocked him off the motorcycle, fractured his right tibia, and lodged some shrapnel in his right buttock. He was sent back to England on October 17, 1944.

While recovering from injuries, Guarnere did not want to be assigned to another unit, so he put black shoe polish all over his cast, put his pants leg over the cast, and walked out of the hospital in severe pain. He was caught by an officer, court-martialed, demoted to private, and returned to the hospital. He told them he would just go AWOL again to rejoin Easy Company. The hospital kept him a week longer and then transferred him back to his unit. Guarnere arrived at Mourmelon-le-Grand, just outside Reims, where the 101st was on R&R, about December 10, 1944, just before the company was sent to the Battle of the Bulge in Belgium, on December 16. Because the paperwork did not arrive from England about his court-martial and demotion, he was reinstated in his same position.

While holding the line, just up the hill southwest of Foy, a massive artillery barrage hit Easy Company in their position. Guarnere lost his right leg in the incoming barrage, while trying to drag his friend Joe Toye (who had also lost his right leg) to safety. This injury ended Guarnere's participation in the war.

In his autobiography, Beyond Band of Brothers: Memoirs of Major Richard Winters, Richard Winters referred to Guarnere as a "natural killer."

== Later life and death ==
Guarnere was discharged on March 15, 1945 and returned to the United States in the same month and took on many odd jobs. He wore an artificial right leg until he was able to secure full disability from the Army, then threw away the limb, using only crutches thereafter, and retired.

He became an active member of many veterans organizations, and presided over many Easy Company reunions.

After returning home from Europe, Guarnere married his girlfriend Frances Peca (d. 1997) and had two sons, Eugene and William Jr. Eugene would follow in his father's footsteps and briefly served in Vietnam.

Guarnere wrote Brothers in Battle, Best of Friends: Two WWII Paratroopers from the Original Band of Brothers Tell Their Story with his best friend Edward "Babe" Heffron and Robyn Post, outlining Easy Company's experiences. The book was published by Berkley Publishing Group, Penguin Books, in 2007. Guarnere also wrote a short piece for Silver Eagle: the official biography of Band of Brothers veteran Clancy Lyall, which was used as the afterword. British publisher Pneuma Springs Publishing released the book in March 2013.

Guarnere and Heffron remained lifelong friends after returning home. Guarnere was Heffron's best man at the latter's wedding in 1954. He was also the godfather to Heffron's daughter Patricia.

Guarnere died of a ruptured aneurysm at Jefferson University Hospital in Philadelphia, on 8 March 2014. He was 90 years old. He is survived by his two sons, nine grandchildren and fourteen great-grandchildren.

== Legacy ==
Guarnere's life and military service were honored by the Commonwealth of Pennsylvania with a half-staff flag order by Pennsylvania Governor Tom Corbett.

After his death, his granddaughter, Debi Lynch Rafferty, formed the Wild Bill Guarnere Memorial Fund to continue his tradition of giving back to veterans. On September 19, 2015, the Fund presented an 8-foot bronze statue of Guarnere by sculptor Chad Fisher to the Delaware County Veterans Memorial.

Another statue of Guarnere was dedicated in 2019 in Philadelphia alongside one of Babe Heffron.
