= Renée Lemaire =

Belgian nurse (1914–1944)

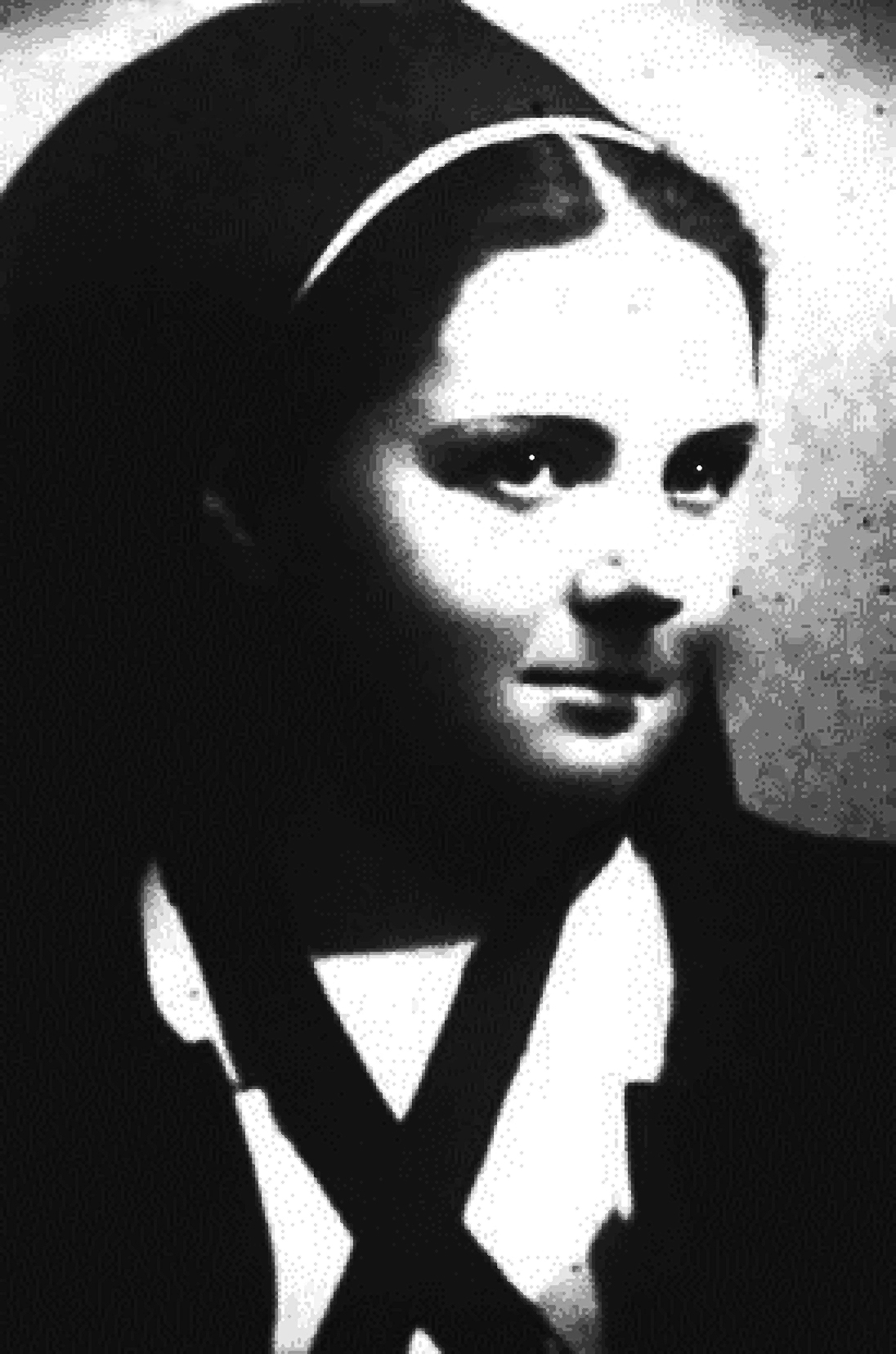
- Born: Renée Bernadette Émilie Lemaire; 10 April 1914; Bastogne, Belgium
- Died: 24 December 1944 (aged 30); Bastogne, Belgium
- Occupation: Registered Nurse
- Parent(s): Gustave Lemaire; Berth Gallée

Renée Lemaire (10 April 1914 – 24 December 1944) was a Belgian nurse who volunteered her service at an American military aid station during the Siege of Bastogne in December 1944. She was killed during a German air raid on Christmas Eve in 1944.

== Early life ==
Renée Bernadette Émilie Lemaire was born on 10 April 1914 in Bastogne to Gustave Lemaire and Bertha Gallée. Her parents owned a hardware store in Bastogne. She had two sisters, Gisèle and Marguerite. Lemaire had been a nurse in Brussels during the war. Renée Lemaire was the fiancée of a Jew arrested in Brussels by the Gestapo earlier in the year.

== World War II ==
In December 1944, Renée Lemaire returned to Bastogne to visit her parents, and was trapped when the Germans launched their Ardennes offensive on 16 December 1944. Along with nurse Augusta Chiwy, she volunteered at an aid station for the American 20th Armored Infantry Battalion on 21 December 1944. In a commendation request from battalion surgeon Jack T. Prior, Lemaire was described as "cheerfully accepted the Herculean task and worked without adequate rest or food...", that she "changed dressings, fed patients unable to feed themselves, gave out medications, bathed and made the patients more comfortable...", and "her very presence among those wounded men seem to be an inspiration to those whose morale had declined from prolonged suffering."

On 24 December 1944, around 20:30, Germans bombed the building where the aid station was located. According to a column in a Belgian newspaper, the aid station in the basement of the Sarma Store on rue de Neufchateau was demolished. Lemaire managed to evacuate six soldiers from the burning building, but died while attempting to save a seventh wounded. Battalion surgeon Prior recovered her remains, and brought them back to her parents wrapped in a white parachute – a parachute she had insisted on recovering that very morning to make herself a wedding dress one day.

== Band of Brothers ==
In the Band of Brothers episode "Bastogne", a Belgian nurse named Renée (portrayed by Lucie Jeanne) and a Congolese nurse named Anna (portrayed by Rebecca Okot) were shown working tirelessly with American medics, including Eugene Roe, to help wounded soldiers. Historical accounts of Lemaire do not mention Roe.
