= Humanitarian Service Medal =

Award of the United States military

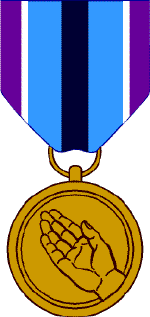
- Obverse
- Type: Military medal Service medal
- Awarded for: Meritorious direct participation in a significant military act or operation of a humanitarian nature.
- Presented by: the Department of Defense
- Eligibility: U.S. military personnel
- Reverse
- Status: Active
- Established: Executive Order 11965, January 19, 1977
- First award: 1977 (retroactive to April 1, 1975)
- Service ribbon

Precedence
- Next (higher): Armed Forces Service Medal
- Next (lower): Military Outstanding Volunteer Service Medal
- Related: Civilian Award for Humanitarian Service

The Humanitarian Service Medal (HSM) is a military service medal of the United States Armed Forces which was created on January 19, 1977 by President Gerald Ford under Executive Order 11965. The medal may be awarded to members of the United States military (including Reserve and National Guard members) who distinguish themselves by meritorious participation in specified military acts or operations of a humanitarian nature.

== Creation ==
Julia V. Taft, the director of the Interagency Task Force (IATF) for Indochinese resettlement proposed the establishment of a Humanitarian Service Medal for U.S. military personnel and submitted the request to President Gerald R. Ford on November 10, 1975. The medal was to be awarded to those personnel that participated in the evacuation of Vietnamese and Cambodian refugees after the Vietnam War. The proposal was met with dissent by Army Lieutenant General Harold G. Moore, who was concerned that the military was over-decorating its personnel with awards of participation rather than those of extraordinary achievement. He proposed a certificate of achievement as a more appropriate recognition. Army Lieutenant General John W. Vessey supported the creation of the medal as a precedent to recognize military participation in major humanitarian actions. Vessey's view prevailed and President Ford established the medal in 1977 as one of the last acts of his presidency.

== Criteria ==
This medal is presented as an individual service medal. The activities in which the Humanitarian Service Medal may be authorized are designated by the United States Department of Defense. Such activities include natural disaster relief, evacuation of non-combatants from a hostile area, or humanitarian support to refugees. This medal may not be awarded for services rendered in domestic disturbances involving law enforcement, riots, or protection of property. This medal may also not be presented if either the Armed Forces Service Medal or Armed Forces Expeditionary Medal was presented for the same period of service.

The Humanitarian Service Medal is retroactive to April 2, 1975.

The Department of the Army awards the Civilian Award for Humanitarian Service for similar service by Army civilian employees, as well as private U.S. and foreign citizens.

== Appearance ==
Centered on the obverse of the medal within a circle, is a right hand pointing diagonally upward with open palm, (to symbolize a giving or helping hand). At the top of the reverse of the medal is the inscription, For Humanitarian Service in three lines. Below this is an oak branch, with three leaves and three acorns, and below this, around the outside edge of the medal, is the inscription, United States Armed Forces.

Additional awards and devices

Subsequent awards of the Humanitarian Service Medal are denoted by wearing a bronze service star on the HSM suspension and service ribbon. A silver service star is worn in lieu of five bronze service stars.

== Approved operations ==
Below is a non-exhaustive list of operations approved since 2020 in accordance with the Department of Defense.

Approved operations for the Humanitarian Service Medal
Area or operation	Start date	End date	Geographic area (note 1)
Hurricanes Eta and Iota	November 5, 2020	December 5, 2020	Honduras, Guatemala, Belize, El Salvador, Costa Rica, Dominican Republic, Nicaragua, Panama, and Colombia, adjacent airspace and adjacent waters within 10 nautical miles
DoD Coronavirus Disease 2019 (COVID-19) Operations / Activities	January 31, 2020	June 1, 2023	Global
Operation Allies Refuge (OAR) & Allies Welcome (OAW)	31 August 2021	1 Apr 2022	Afghanistan, United States, Qatar, Saudi Arabia
Pakistan Flood Relief	September 1, 2022	September 16, 2022	Pakistan and extending 12 nautical miles to sea per the international maritime sea boundary
Türkiye Earthquake Relief	February 6, 2023	March 10, 2023	The provinces of Gaziantep, Kahramanmaras, Sanliurfa, Diyarbakir, Adana, Adiyaman, Osmaniye, Hatay, Kilis, and Malatya within the country of Türkiye
Super Typhoon Mawar	May 19, 2023	June 20, 2023	Territory of Guam
Mount Bagana Eruption	August 7, 2023	August 16, 2023	The Bougainville Region of Papua New Guinea
Hawaii and Maui Wildfires	August 8, 2023	December 31, 2023	The islands of Hawaii and Maui
Operation NEPTUNE SOLACE (ONS)	March 2, 2024	August 31, 2024	Cyprus, the Eastern Mediterranean Sea corridor from Cyprus to Gaza, the Gaza coastline and territorial waters, and the airspace of Gaza
Hurricane Milton	October 9, 2024	December 20, 2024	The following counties in Florida: Brevard, Charlotte, Citrus, Clay, Collier, DeSoto, Duval, Flagler, Glades, Hardee, Hendry, Hernando, Highlands, Hillsborough, Indian River, Lake, Lee, Manatee, Marion, Martin, Miccosukee Indian Reservation, Nassau, Okeechobee, Orange, Osceola, Palm Beach, Pasco. Pinellas, Polk, Putnam, Sarasota, Seminole, St. Johns, St. Lucie, Sumter, and Volusia
Hurricane Helene	September 29, 2024	December 20, 2024	Qualifying counties in Florida, Georgia, South Carolina, North Carolina, Tennessee, and Virginia
