= Edward Heffron =

American veteran of World War II

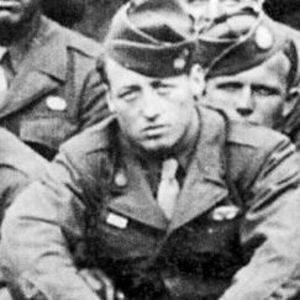
- Private Edward Heffron in World War II
- Born: 16 May 1923; Philadelphia, Pennsylvania, U.S.
- Died: 1 December 2013 (aged 90); Stratford, New Jersey, U.S.
- Relatives: Joseph (father); Anne (mother)
- Military career
- Allegiance: United States
- Branch: United States Army
- Service years: 1942–1945
- Rank: Private First Class
- Nickname: "Babe"
- Units: E Company, 2nd Battalion, 506th Parachute Infantry Regiment, 101st Airborne Division
- Conflicts: World War II: Operation Overlord; Operation Market Garden; Battle of the Bulge
- Awards: Bronze Star Medal; Purple Heart
- Other work: Author

Edward James "Babe" Heffron (16 May 1923 – 1 December 2013) was a private with E Company, 2nd Battalion, 506th Parachute Infantry Regiment, in the 101st Airborne Division of the United States Army during World War II. Heffron was portrayed in the HBO miniseries Band of Brothers by Robin Laing. In 2007, Heffron wrote Brothers in Battle, Best of Friends: Two WWII Paratroopers from the Original Band of Brothers Tell Their Story with fellow veteran William "Wild Bill" Guarnere and journalist Robyn Post.

== Early life ==
Edward James Heffron was born in South Philadelphia, Pennsylvania, in 1923, the third of five children to Joseph (a prison guard) and Anne. The family was Irish Catholic and attended Mass every Sunday; Heffron and his siblings attended Sacred Heart Catholic School. He attended South Philadelphia High School, but had to drop out to earn money during the Great Depression.

Heffron went to work at New York Shipbuilding in Camden, New Jersey, sandblasting cruisers in preparation for converting them to light aircraft carriers. Because of his job, he had a 2B exemption from military service, but he did not use it, since he wanted to go with his friend, Anthony Cianfrani, into the airborne. As a teenager, he had developed an intermittent medical condition where his hands and fingers would curl under and lock up, causing severe pain (possibly, the onset of Dupuytren's contracture), but this was never mentioned to anyone as he wanted to continue playing football in school. Either the exemption or the medical condition would have allowed him to remain stateside, but he refused to stay home when his brothers (Joseph, James, and John), friends, and neighbors were all doing their duty. Heffron enlisted on 7 November 1942 in his hometown.

== Military service ==
As a replacement member of E Company, Heffron fought and proved himself in several major battles, including Operation Overlord in France, Operation Market Garden in the Netherlands, and the Battle of the Bulge in Bastogne, Belgium. During the latter, he served as a machine gunner and was awarded the Bronze Star. He helped to liberate the Kaufering concentration camp in Landsberg, Germany, and to seize Hitler's Eagle's Nest (Kehlsteinhaus).

While at jump school, Heffron made a pact with his two best friends, John T. "Johnny" Julian and J. D. Henderson, that if anything happened to one of them, the others would gather up that person's personal belongings and return them to that person's family, while also making sure that they contacted the family and carried out any other individual requests. Henderson was wounded in Veghel, and made it back to the US. Julian and Heffron served together in Easy Company.

On 1 January 1945, Heffron was in his foxhole manning his machine gun when he heard Sergeant Johnny Martin cry out that Julian had been hit. He left his position and attempted to get to Julian, but enemy fire prevented any approach. Every time he tried to make a move for Julian, the Germans opened fire, driving Heffron and his fellow soldiers back. Later, the squad that Julian was in repelled the Germans and brought back his body, but Heffron could not bring himself to look at his friend's corpse. It would be 12 years after the war before Heffron could bring himself to call Julian's mother, honoring the pact he and his friends had made at jump school.

In early May 1945, after Easy Company's penultimate operation, the capture of the Eagle's Nest, Heffron was standing guard duty at a crossroads near Berchtesgaden when German General Theodor Tolsdorff, commander of the LXXXII Corps, came down the road leading 31 vehicles (much of them loaded with the general's personal property). The general told Heffron that he wished to surrender, but only to an officer, not to an enlisted man. The officer who ultimately accepted the surrender was Lt. Carwood Lipton.

== Later years ==
After the war, Heffron went to work for Publicker Industries, which operated a whiskey distillery at 3223 South Delaware Avenue in Philadelphia. His brothers worked at Publicker's Snyder Avenue plant, also in South Philadelphia. In 1966, after he had been employed by Publicker for 20 years, the company moved its Philadelphia operations to Linfield, Pennsylvania. Heffron did not move with the company, and spent the next 27 years working on the Philadelphia waterfront, checking cargo and clerking.

Heffron and Guarnere remained lifelong friends after returning home. Guarnere was best man at Heffron's wedding in 1954, then godfather to Heffron's daughter Patricia.

In the Band of Brothers miniseries, Heffron was played by Scottish actor Robin Laing. Heffron appears as himself at the end of episode ten, speaking about the company, and also makes a brief cameo appearance in the fourth episode, as an unidentified man sitting at a table in Eindhoven and waving a small flag as Sgt. Floyd Talbert kisses a Dutch woman.

Heffron and Guarnere wrote Brothers in Battle, Best of Friends: Two WWII Paratroopers from the Original Band of Brothers Tell Their Story with journalist Robyn Post in 2007, outlining the activities of E Company from 1942 to 1945. They also appear in the documentary We Stand Alone Together.

In 2013, Heffron, who never graduated from high school, was named an honorary graduate of West Point High School in West Point, Virginia.

== Death and legacy ==
Heffron died on 1 December 2013 at Kennedy Hospital in Stratford, New Jersey;

On 17 September 2015, the 71st anniversary of Operation Market Garden, a statue of Heffron's likeness was unveiled in his old neighborhood in South Philadelphia. Located near 2nd and Reed streets, the 5-foot-7-inch (1.70 m) statue includes a plaque detailing Heffron's military career, as well as a bronze heart that contains a portion of his and his wife's ashes. In 2019, the statue was additionally joined by one of Bill Guarnere.
