= Million-dollar wound =

Military slang for a type of wound

"Million-dollar wound" (American English) or "Blighty wound" (British English) is military slang for a type of wound received in combat which is serious enough to get the soldier sent away from the fighting, but neither fatal nor permanently crippling.

== Description ==
In his World War II memoir With the Old Breed, Eugene Sledge wrote that during the Battle of Okinawa, the day after he tried to reassure a fellow United States Marine who believed he would soon die,

Much to my joy I saw the friend with whom I'd had the conversation the night before. He wore a triumphant look of satisfaction, shook hands with me heartily, and grinned as a stretcher team carried him by with a bloody bandage on his foot. God or chance—depending on one's faith— had spared his life and lifted his burden of further fear and terror in combat by awarding him a million-dollar wound. He had done his duty, and the war was over for him. He was in pain, but he was lucky. Many others hadn't been as lucky the last couple of days.

Writing in his posthumously published World War II memoir Parachute Infantry, paratrooper David Kenyon Webster described how "ecstatic" he was to get the "million dollar wound" in his calf that put him out of action for a couple of weeks but would not permanently disable him.

A similar concept is the Blighty (a slang term for Britain or England) wound, a British reference from World War I. Bridge 6D over the Yser Canal in the Ypres Salient was known as 'Blighty Bridge' from the number of casualties suffered from crossing it at night under fire.

== In popular culture ==
In the film Forrest Gump, the titular character receives a gunshot to his backside during his service in the Vietnam War, which leaves him sidelined from combat for months (ultimately serving as the end of his combat service, but for unrelated reasons). Due to Gump's below-average intelligence, he takes the expression "million dollar wound" literally, saying: "the Army must keep that money, 'cause I still ain't seen a nickel of that million dollars".
