= Lucie Jeanne =

French television actress (born 1976)

- Born: 13 March 1976 (age 50); Paris, France
- Occupation: Actress
- Years active: 1998–present
- Television: Sous le Soleil; Central Nuit; Band of Brothers

Lucie Jeanne (born 13 March 1976) is a French television actress.

== Biography ==
Lucie Jeanne began theater at age 16 and took classes in a dancing, music and dramatic art school for four years. After obtaining her high school final exam in literature, she studied modern literature at the faculty and graduated three years later.

She began her career appearing in many short films and advertisements, and later in many films and series. These include Sous le Soleil where she had a recurring role in the fifth season, and Central Nuit from 2001 to 2008, in which she was part of the main cast portraying Blanche, one of the colleagues of Commandant Victor Franklin, portrayed by Michel Creton.

== Filmography ==
Year	Title	Role	Director	Notes
1998	Les vacances de l'amour	Gaëlle Mulligan	Olivier Altman	TV series (1 episode)
1999	Triste à mourir	Nath	Alexandre Billon	Short
1999-2000	Sous le soleil	Victoria	Several	TV series (34 episodes)
2000	Jean et Monsieur Alfred	The Secretary	Frédéric Dubreuil	Short
2000	Deux frères	Isabelle Coutier	Philippe Laïk	TV movie
2000	Relic Hunter	Roselyn	Paolo Barzman	TV series (1 episode)
2000	Le grand patron	Caroline Salmon	Claude-Michel Rome	TV series (1 episode)
2000	Les boeuf-carottes	Laetitia Souvillon	Christian Faure	TV series (1 episode)
2001	Band of Brothers	Renée Lemaire	David Leland	TV mini-series
2001	Largo Winch	Danielle Haddad	David Wu	TV series (1 episode)
2001	Vertiges	Various	Philippe Monpontet, Gérard Cuq & Benoît d'Aubert	TV series (3 episodes)
2001-09	Central nuit	Blanche Servais	Several	TV series (40 episodes)
2002	L'été rouge	Audrey De Graf	Gérard Marx	TV mini-series
2002	Le G.R.E.C.		Henri Hasbani	TV series (1 episode)
2003	Quand je vois le soleil	Marie-Ange	Jacques Cortal	
2003	L'homme sans tête	The Client	Juan Solanas	Short
2003	Ne meurs pas	Christelle Dalembert	José Pinheiro	TV movie
2003	Joséphine, ange gardien	Pauline	David Delrieux	TV series (1 episode)
2004	Femmes de loi	Clara Vérone	Denis Malleval	TV series (1 episode)
2004	Premiers secours	Jeanne Delerme	Didier Delaître	TV series (1 episode)
2004	Les Cordier, juge et flic	Sarah Neubourg	Jean-Marc Seban	TV series (1 episode)
2005	Contre-enquête	Tina	Dennis Berry	TV movie
2005	Fargas	Irène Calabrese	Christophe Douchand	TV series (1 episode)
2006	Hé M'sieur !	Patricia Robineau	Patrick Volson	TV movie
2006	Mayday	Passenger	Andy Webb	TV series (1 episode)
2006	Léa Parker	Eva Sinibaldi	Bruno Gantillon	TV series (1 episode)
2007	Marié(s) ou presque	Eva	Franck Llopis	
2008	Changing Climates, Changing Times	Lucie Peyrefitte	Marion Milne	TV movie
2009	Jamais 2 sans 3	Angèle	Eric Summer	TV movie
2009	R.I.S, police scientifique	Léa Burjol	Jérôme Navarro	TV series (1 episode)
2010	Section de recherches	Julie Lagnier	Gérard Marx (2)	TV series (1 episode)
2010	Enquêtes réservées	Marine Gibot	Bruno Garcia & Gérard Cuq (2)	TV series (8 episodes)
2011	Commissaire Magellan	Roxane Courtieux	Étienne Dhaene	TV series (1 episode)
2012	Mes deux amours	Noémie	Régis Musset	TV movie
2012	Joséphine, ange gardien	Fabricia	Pascal Heylbroeck	TV series (1 episode)
2013	Profilage	Sabrina Fontel	Julien Despaux	TV series (1 episode)
2013	La croisière	Amandine	Pascal Lahmani	TV series (1 episode)
2014	La disparue du Pyla	Angèle Colombani	Didier Albert	TV movie
2014	Le juge est une femme	Pia Besse	Eric Le Roux	TV series (1 episode)
2015	Meurtres à la Rochelle	Adèle Fabian	Étienne Dhaene (2)	TV movie
2015	Commissaire Magellan	Charlotte Neuville	Étienne Dhaene (3)	TV series (1 episode)
