= Mark Lawrence (actor) =

British actor

Mark Lawrence is a British actor. He went to Dorcan School in Dorcan, studied in New York at the Lee Strasberg Institute, and started his career in London on shows such as CrimeWatch and Family Affairs. His most notable role was in the 2001 miniseries Band of Brothers.
