= Civilian Award for Humanitarian Service =

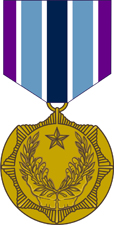
- Medal of the Civilian Award for Humanitarian Service
- Type: Civilian honorary and public service award
- Awarded for: Meritorious direct "hands-on" participation in an act or operation of a humanitarian nature directed toward an individual or groups of individuals
- Country: United States
- Presented by: Department of the Army
- Eligibility: Army civilian employees, as well as private citizens of the United States, or private citizens and government officials of foreign nations.
- Established: November 1985
- Ribbon bar of the medal
- Related: Humanitarian Service Medal

The Civilian Award for Humanitarian Service is both an honorary and public service award presented by the Department of the Army to individuals who have distinguished themselves by meritorious direct "hands-on" participation in an act or operation of a humanitarian nature directed toward an individual or groups of individuals.

== Nomination for Award ==
Any commander at the major Army command level or higher may approve this award. This award is for individuals who have distinguished themselves by meritorious direct "hands-on" participation in an act or operation of a humanitarian nature directed toward an individual or groups of individuals. Documentation must provide evidence which substantiates on site participation in a humanitarian act or operation. Nomination should cover a period of service during which the individual performed significant humanitarian actions, deeds, or achievements. Achievements deserving Major Army command or Department of the Army-wide recognition should be submitted to the major Army commander or Secretary of the Army for approval. When the Secretary of Defense designates an act or operation to be a "Humanitarian Act or Operation", major Army commands may process this award for employees participating in the act or operation, on the basis of accurate lists of participants without requiring a separate justification for each participant.

== Description ==
The medal of the award is a bronze disc 35 mm in diameter. The obverse has a raised circle with two hands palms up each holding a laurel wreath. The wreath arches up towards top center towards the relief of a five-pointed star. The raised circle is surrounded by an outer circle of eight rays pointing outwards. The top center most ray forming a lug for the suspension ribbon. The medal is suspended from a ribbon 35 mm in width consisting of stripes purple at the edges, separated by a thin white stripe, from a light blue stripe, a thin white stripe, with a central stripe of dark blue.

== See also ==
- Awards and decorations of the United States government

== Notable recipients ==
- Augusta Chiwy - Belgian nurse for service at the Siege of Bastogne
- Thomas P. Carr - Army Medical Department civilian supervisor who was a first responder in the Loma Prieta (San Francisco) earthquake of 1989.
- David M. Satterfield - Special Envoy for Middle East Humanitarian Issues
