= Graphic Arts Monthly =

American trade publication

- Type: business magazine
- Format: Paper and online magazine
- Owner: Reed Business Information
- Editor: Bill Esler
- Founded: 1929
- Ceased publication: 2010
- Language: English
- Headquarters: Oak Brook, Illinois, USA
- Circulation: 70,100
- ISSN: 1047-9325
- Website: Graphic Arts Monthly

Graphic Arts Monthly (ISSN 1047-9325) was a trade publication and website owned by Reed Business Information serving the information needs of the printing industry, including printers and trade plants. Reed predecessor Cahners Publishing acquired Graphic Arts Monthly's publisher Technical Publishing in 1986.

The editor-in-chief was Bill Esler, with the editorial offices located in Oak Brook, Illinois, USA.

As the name implies, Graphic Arts Monthly had been published monthly since its establishment in 1929. Several common articles included Best Track, Ink Etc., Mail Call, and Sales Call.

In September, Graphic Arts Monthly published The Official Show Daily, which was produced on behalf of the Graphic Arts Show Company for the annual Graph Expo & PackPrint.

As of June 2008, total BPA audited circulation was 70,100 subscribers.
