= Siege of Bastogne =

American/German engagement December 1944

- Part of the Battle of the Bulge during World War II
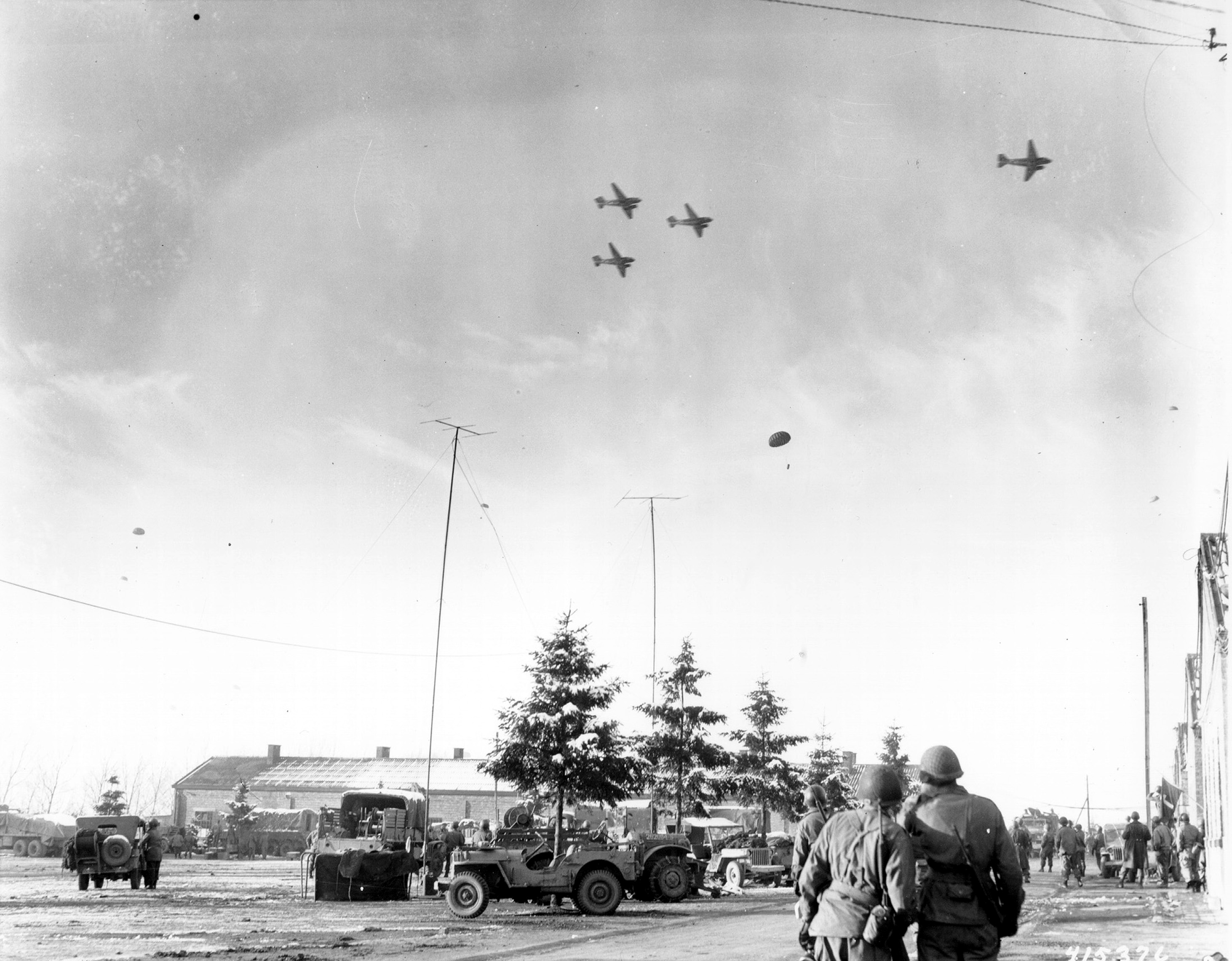
- 101st Airborne Division troops watch as C-47s drop supplies over Bastogne, 26 December 1944
Date	20–26 December 1944
Location	Bastogne, Wallonia, Belgium 50°00′00″N 5°43′17″E
Result	American victory

Belligerents
United States	Germany

Commanders and leaders
George S. Patton; Anthony McAuliffe	Hasso von Manteuffel; Heinrich von Lüttwitz; Heinz Kokott

Units involved
Initially parts of: 101st Airborne Division; CCB of the 10th Armored Division; CCR of the 9th Armored Division; 705th Tank Destroyer Battalion; 35th and 158th Combat Engineer Battalions; 58th and 420th Armored Field Artillery Battalions; 755th and 969th Field Artillery Battalions of VIII Corps; Team SNAFU; 9th Air Force; 510th Fighter Squadron; 368th Fighter Group	Initially parts of: 26th Volksgrenadier Division; Panzer Lehr Division; 2nd Panzer Division

Strength
101st: 11,000 enlisted + 800 officers; Remaining units: 11,000+; Total: 22,800+ men (initially)	54,000 men

Casualties and losses
3,000+ total casualties (2,000 in the 101st)	Unknown
- Location within Belgium

The siege of Bastogne (French pronunciation: [bas.tɔɲ]) was an engagement in December 1944 between American and German forces at the Belgian town of Bastogne, as part of the larger Battle of the Bulge. The goal of the German offensive was the harbor at Antwerp. In order to reach it before the Allies could regroup and bring their superior air power to bear, German mechanized forces had to seize the roadways through eastern Belgium. Because all seven main roads in the densely wooded Ardennes highlands converged on Bastogne, just a few miles away from the border with neighboring Luxembourg, control of its crossroads was vital to the German attack.

The German offensive began on 16 December. Although outnumbered, the regiments of the 28th Infantry Division delayed the German advance towards Bastogne, allowing American units, including the 101st Airborne Division, to reach Bastogne before the German forces surrounded the town and isolated it on 20 December. Until 23 December, the weather prevented Allied aircraft from attempting to resupply Bastogne or from performing ground attack missions against German forces. The siege was lifted on 26 December, when a spearhead of the 4th Armored Division and other elements of General George Patton's Third Army opened a corridor to Bastogne and American victory at the Battle of the Bulge.

== Background ==
After the successful invasion of Normandy and the subsequent eastward push through France, the Allied front lines extended from Nijmegen in the north down to neutral Switzerland in the south. The valuable port city of Antwerp had been captured during the push, and by the time winter arrived, the Allies even had control of German territory near the city of Aachen. Adolf Hitler soon laid out a plan to attack the Allied lines in Belgium and Luxembourg; 25 divisions would launch a surprise attack through the Ardennes, with the aim of crossing the river Meuse (called Maas in German and Dutch) and recapturing Antwerp. Despite major misgivings from his senior commanders, including Gerd von Rundstedt and Walther Model, the plan was not modified and the jump-off date was eventually set as 16 December 1944.

Meanwhile, the Allied commanders considered the Ardennes area to be unsuitable for a large-scale German attack, mainly because of terrain issues. In addition, intelligence reports suggested that the only German divisions stationed in the area were weary, and in the weeks leading up to the assault, no Allied commander saw reason to believe that an attack was imminent. Bastogne, a hub city that commanded several important roads in the area, was defended mainly by the 28th Infantry Division, which had seen continuous fighting from 22 July to 19 November, most recently in the Battle of Hürtgen Forest, before being assigned to this relatively quiet area. The Allies believed only an infantry division was present opposite the 28th Infantry, and they believed any attack along this sector would be limited in scale. The seven roads in and out of Bastogne were critical to the movement of German armor, making Allied retention of the roads imperative.

Hasso von Manteuffel—commanding the 5th Panzer Army—gave Heinrich Freiherr von Lüttwitz′s XLVII Panzer Corps responsibility for capturing Bastogne, before crossing the Meuse near Namur. Lüttwitz planned to attack a 7 mi (11 km) front with three divisions: the 26th Volksgrenadier and the 2nd Panzer would lead the assault, with the Panzer-Lehr-Division behind them. Opposing this significant force were two battalions of the 110th Infantry Regiment (the third was held back as a division reserve), responsible for a 9 mi (14 km) front along the river Our which forms the border between Germany and neighboring Luxembourg. The Allied forces were gathered into small groups at major Luxembourgish villages, with outposts along the river manned only during the daytime. Being too thin to maintain an even battle line, the defenders focused their attention on the four roads that crossed the Our. Due to heavy rain preceding the German attack, only one of the roads was in good enough condition to be used as a crossing point—the northernmost road, which crossed the Our at Dasburg on its way to the Luxembourgish town of Clervaux (in German: Klerf, in Luxembourgish: Klierf) and Bastogne. The 2nd Panzer Division was assigned to cross the river along this road, while the 26th Volksgrenadier Division would construct a bridge 4 1/2 mi (7 km) south near Gemünd for its crossing. Lüttwitz realized the importance of the road network of Bastogne—he knew that the town had to be captured before his corps could venture too far westward. Therefore, he ordered the Panzer-Lehr Division to push forward to Bastogne as soon as his other troops had crossed the river Clerve in Northern Luxembourg.

== Prelude ==
=== The attack ===
On the evening of 15 December, the 26th Volksgrenadier established an outpost line on the west bank of the Our, something they did routinely during the nighttime. At 03:00, engineers began ferrying men and equipment over the river where they began assembling at the departure point, quite close to the American garrisons. At 05:30, the German artillery began bombarding the American positions, knocking out telephone lines, as the infantry started to advance. The Germans attacked swiftly, their advances made possible by sheer weight of numbers. In the Luxembourgish village of Weiler, one American company, supported by some mortars and a platoon of anti-tank guns, lasted until nightfall against repeated attacks from multiple German battalions. German engineers completed bridges over the Our before dark, and armor began moving to the front, adding to the Germans' vast numerical superiority. But in the end, the Germans were significantly delayed by the American defenders—their plan to cross the Clerf River by nightfall on the first day was delayed by three days.

On 19 December, the 28th Division command post transferred to Bastogne from Wiltz, a large Luxembourgish town to the southeast. At Wiltz, the division put up its last stand; 3rd Battalion of the 110th—supported by armor and artillery—arrived at the town around noon of that day. The 44th Engineer Battalion was set up north of the town, but they were soon overwhelmed and retreated into the town, blowing up a bridge behind them. This small force—numbering no more than 500 in total—held out until the evening, when their position became completely untenable and they retreated to the west. With the 110th Infantry completely destroyed as an effective combat unit, it would be up to the rest of the Allied army to defend Bastogne.

=== Commitment of reserves ===
Despite several notable signs in the weeks preceding the attack, the Ardennes Offensive achieved virtually complete surprise. By the end of the second day of battle, it became apparent that the 28th Infantry was near collapse. To assist in the defense of Bastogne, Major General Troy H. Middleton, already commander of VIII Corps, was given Combat Command B of the 10th Armored Division. CCB consisted of the 3rd Tank Battalion, 20th Armored Infantry Battalion, C Company 21st Tank Battalion, B Company 54th Armored Infantry Battalion, C Company, 609th Tank Destroyer Battalion, 419th Armored Field Artillery Battalion, and three companies of support troops. General George S. Patton, commander of the U.S. Third Army was not happy about giving up the CCB unit right before he planned an offensive near Mainz but General Omar Bradley, commander of the 12th Army Group, ordered Patton to release the unit. Meanwhile, General Dwight D. Eisenhower, the Supreme Allied Commander, ordered forward the SHAEF reserve, composed of the 82nd Airborne Division, commanded by Major General James Gavin, and the 101st Airborne Division, temporarily under command of Brigadier General Anthony McAuliffe, at Reims. These were veteran troops that had served with distinction since the parachute drops in Normandy and were resting and re-equipping after two months of combat in the Netherlands after Operation Market Garden. Both divisions were alerted on the evening of 17 December, and not having transport automatically assigned for their use, began arranging trucks for movement forward. The 82nd—longer in reserve and thus better re-equipped—moved out first. The 101st left Camp Mourmelon on the afternoon of 18 December, with the order of march of the division artillery, division trains, 501st Parachute Infantry Regiment (PIR), 506th PIR, 502nd PIR, and 327th Glider Infantry Regiment (GIR). Much of the convoy was conducted at night in drizzle and sleet, using headlights despite threat of air attack to speed the movement, and at one point the combined column stretched from Bouillon, Belgium, back to Reims, a distance of 120 kilometres (75 mi).

The 101st Airborne was originally supposed to go to Werbomont on the northern shoulder but was rerouted to Bastogne, located 107 miles (172 km) away on a 1,463-foot (446 m) high plateau, while the 82nd Airborne, because it was able to leave sooner, went to Werbomont to block the critical advance of the Kampfgruppe Peiper ("Combat Group Peiper"). The 705th Tank Destroyer Battalion—in reserve 60 miles (97 km) to the north—was ordered to Bastogne to provide anti-tank support to the armor-less 101st Airborne on 18 December and arrived late the next evening. The first elements of the 501st PIR entered the division assembly area 4 miles (6.4 km) west of Bastogne shortly after midnight of 19 December, and by 09:00 the entire division had arrived.

McAuliffe sent the 501st PIR southeast through Bastogne at 06:00 to develop the situation. By 09:00, it had advanced and deployed on either side of the highway to Magéret and Longvilly, where the Panzer-Lehr-Division was engaged in an all-day action to destroy the armor-infantry combat teams assigned to slow the German advance. The 506th followed shortly thereafter, its 1st Battalion was sent to Noville to reinforce Major William R. Desobry's team from the 10th Armored CCB while the other two battalions were ordered to act as reserves north of Bastogne. The 502nd PIR marched north and northwest to establish a line from Champs east to Recogne, while the 327th GIR, newly arrived, protected the division service area southwest of Bastogne until German intentions could be deciphered.

=== Initial combat at Noville ===
On 19–20 December, the 1st Battalion of the 506th PIR was ordered to support Team Desobry, a battalion-sized tank-infantry task force of the 10th Armored Division assigned to defend Noville located north-northeast of both Foy and of Bastogne just 4.36 mi (7.02 km) away. With just four M18 Hellcat tank destroyers of the 705th Tank Destroyer Battalion to assist, the paratroopers attacked units of the 2nd Panzer Division, whose mission was to proceed by secondary roads via Monaville (just northwest of Bastogne) to seize a key highway and capture, among other objectives, fuel dumps—for the lack of which the overall German counter-offensive faltered and failed. Worried about the threat to its left flank in Bastogne, it organized a major combined arms attack to seize Noville. Team Desobry's high speed highway journey to reach the blocking position is one of the few documented cases in which the 55 mph (89 km/h) top speed of the M18 Hellcat was actually used to get ahead of an enemy force as envisioned by its specifications.

The attack of 1st Battalion and the M18 Hellcat tank destroyers of the 705th TD Battalion together destroyed at least 30 German tanks and inflicted 500–1,000 casualties on the attacking forces in what amounted to a spoiling attack. The 3rd Battalion was ordered forward from a reserve position north of Bastogne to ease the pressure on 1st Battalion by occupying a supporting position in Foy to the south.

The heavy losses inflicted by the tank-destroyers deceived the German commander into believing the village was being held by a much stronger force and he recoiled from further attacks on the village, committing a strategic error while seeking tactical advantage—significantly delaying the German advance and setting the stage for the siege of Bastogne just to the south. This delay also gave the 101st Airborne Division enough time to organize defenses around Bastogne. After two days, the 2nd Panzer Division finally continued on its original mission to the Meuse River. As a consequence of its involvement at Bastogne, and its failure to dislodge the airborne forces, the column ultimately ran out of fuel at Celles, where it was destroyed by the U.S. 2nd Armored Division and the British 29th Armoured Brigade.

By the time the 1st Battalion pulled out of Noville on the 20th, the village of Foy half-way to Bastogne center had been captured from the 3rd Battalion by a separate attack, forcing the 1st Battalion to then fight its way through Foy. By the time 1st Battalion made it to the safety of American lines, it had lost 13 officers and 199 enlisted men, out of about 600 troops, and was assigned as the division reserve. Team Desobry lost a quarter of its troops and was reduced to just four medium tanks when it passed through the lines of 3rd Battalion.

== Battle ==
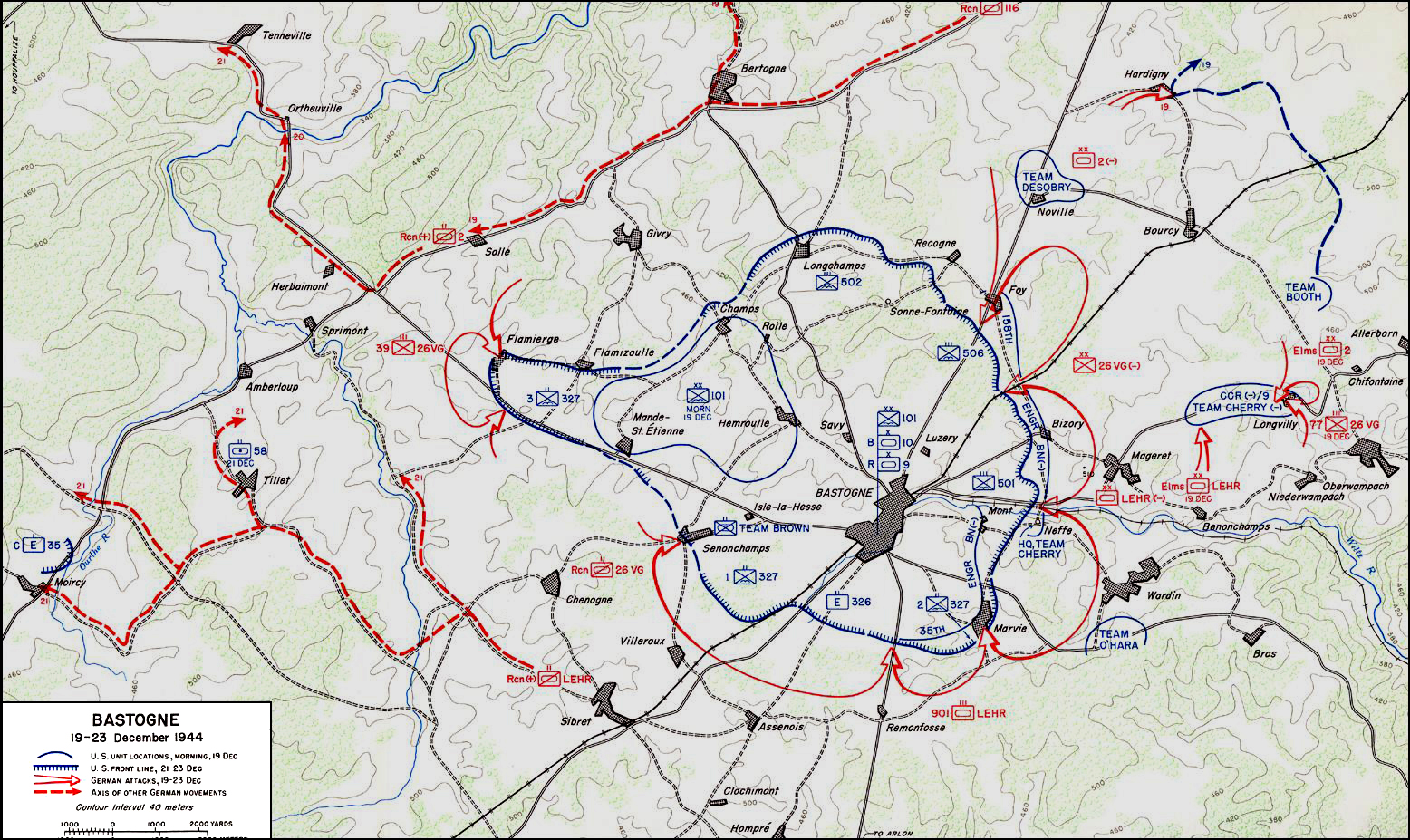
19–23 December 1944

The 101st Airborne formed an all-round perimeter using the 502nd PIR on the northwest shoulder to block the 26th Volksgrenadier, the 506th PIR to block entry from Noville, the 501st PIR defending the eastern approach, and the 327th Glider Infantry Regiment scattered from Marvie in the southeast to Champs in the west along the southern perimeter, augmented by engineer and artillery units plugging gaps in the line. The division service area to the west of Bastogne had been raided the first night, causing the loss of almost its entire medical company, and numerous service troops were used as infantry to reinforce the thin lines. CCB of the 10th Armored Division, severely weakened by losses to its Team Desobry, Team Cherry (Lt. Col. Henry T. Cherry), and Team O'Hara (Lt. Col. James O'Hara) in delaying the Germans, formed a mobile "fire brigade" of 40 light and medium tanks (including survivors of CCR 9th Armored Division and eight replacement tanks found unassigned in Bastogne).

Three artillery battalions were commandeered and formed a temporary artillery group. Each had twelve 155 mm (6.1 in) howitzers, providing the division with heavy firepower in all directions restricted only by its limited ammunition supply. Col. Roberts, commanding CCB, also rounded up 600+ stragglers from the rout of VIII Corps and formed Team SNAFU as a further stopgap force.

Many of the artillery guns were used in a direct fire role against enemy armor, with over 2000 rounds used for this purpose on December 20. The division's anti-aircraft batteries were also moved into the front lines to fire against enemy armor to augment their 57mm anti-tank guns

The antitank batteries were also positioned on the MLR, where, in conjunction with the larger vehicles of the tank destroyer battalion, they formed a defense in depth that the Germans could not penetrate without unacceptable losses. The (anti-aircraft batteries) would engage the German tanks at maximum range, slow the German tanks, and thus give the more mobile tank and tank destroyer units time to move to the point of the German attack and defeat the enemy's armor. Time and again, this technique was used to counter uncoordinated enemy thrusts that came from all directions.

— Ralph M. Mitchell (1986), 101st Airborne Division's defense of Bastogne, p. 38

As a result of the powerful American defense to the north and east, XLVII Panzer Corps commander Gen. von Lüttwitz decided to encircle Bastogne and strike from the south and southwest, beginning on the winter solstice, the night of 20/21 December. German Panzer reconnaissance units had initial success, nearly overrunning the American artillery positions southwest of Bastogne before being stopped by a makeshift force. All seven highways leading to Bastogne were cut by German forces by noon on 21 December, and by nightfall the conglomeration of airborne and armored infantry forces were recognized by both sides as being surrounded.

The American soldiers were outnumbered approximately 5 to 1 and were lacking in cold-weather gear, ammunition, food, medical supplies, and senior leadership (as many senior officers, including the 101st's commander—Major General Maxwell Taylor—were elsewhere). Due to the worst winter weather in memory, the surrounded U.S. forces could not be resupplied by air nor was tactical air support available due to cloudy weather.

However, the two Panzer divisions of the XLVII Panzer Corps—after using their mobility to isolate Bastogne, continued their mission towards the Meuse on 22 December, rather than attacking Bastogne with a single large force. They left just one regiment behind to assist the 26th Volksgrenadier Division in capturing the crossroads. The XLVII Panzer Corps probed different points of the southern and western defensive perimeter in echelon, where Bastogne was defended by just a single airborne regiment and support units doubling as infantry. This played into the American advantage of interior lines; the defenders were able to shift artillery fire and move their limited ad hoc armored forces to meet each successive assault.

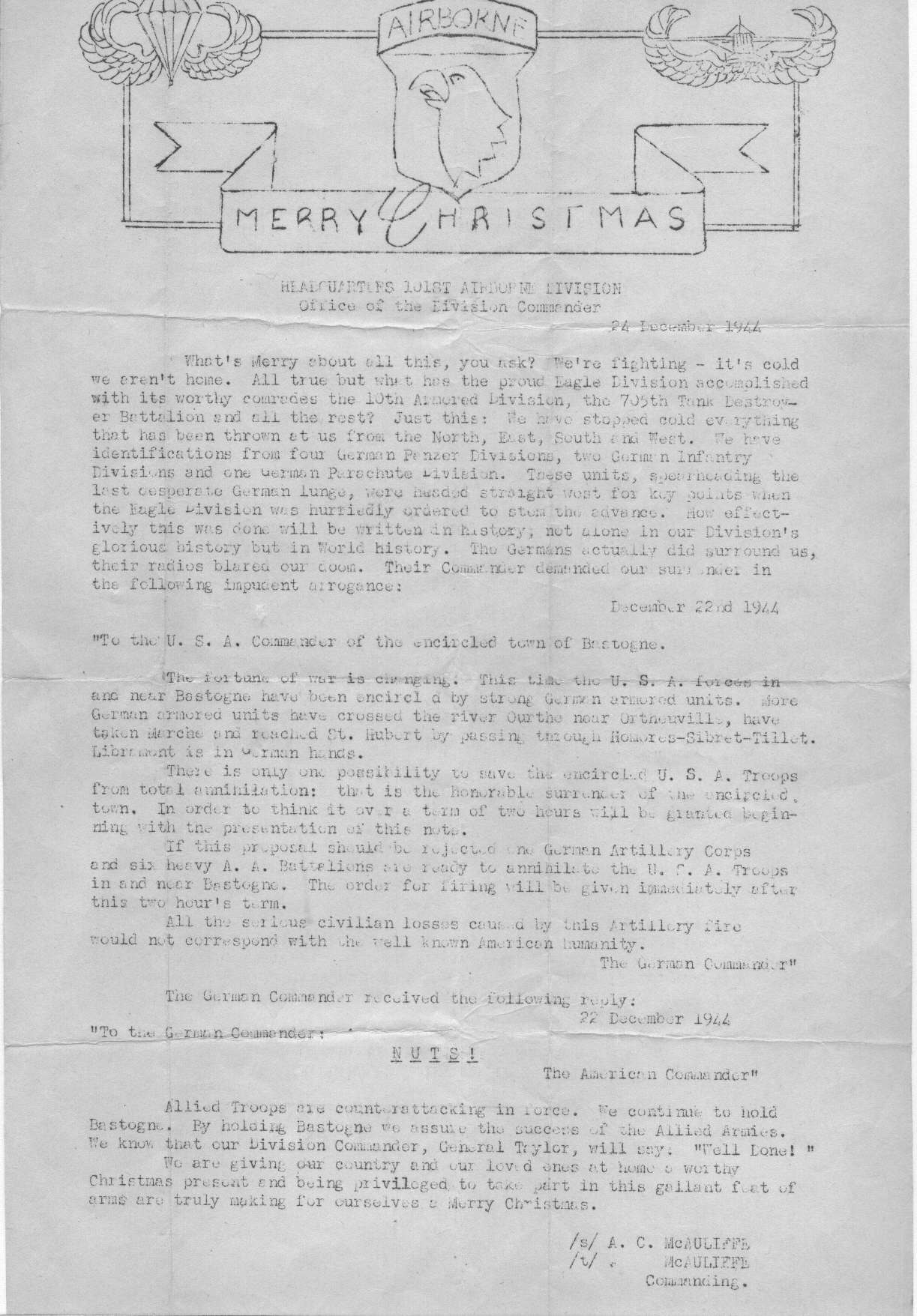
Letter from General McAuliffe on Christmas Day to the 101st Airborne troops defending Bastogne, containing a report of the famous one-word reply to the Germans: NUTS!.

It was on 22 December that von Lüttwitz submitted the following demand for surrender to his American counterpart commanding the American forces in Bastogne, McAuliffe:

To the U.S.A. Commander of the encircled town of Bastogne.

The fortune of war is changing. This time the U.S.A. forces in and near Bastogne have been encircled by strong German armored units. More German armored units have crossed the river Our near Ortheuville, have taken Marche and reached St. Hubert by passing through Hompre-Sibret-Tillet. Libramont is in German hands.

There is only one possibility to save the encircled U.S.A. troops from total annihilation: that is the honorable surrender of the encircled town. In order to think it over a term of two hours will be granted beginning with the presentation of this note.

If this proposal should be rejected one German Artillery Corps and six heavy A. A. Battalions are ready to annihilate the U.S.A. troops in and near Bastogne. The order for firing will be given immediately after this two hours term.

All the serious civilian losses caused by this artillery fire would not correspond with the well-known American humanity.

The German Commander.

Shortly thereafter, McAuliffe sent the following communication to von Lüttwitz in response to the German demand:

To the German Commander.

NUTS!

The American Commander

The commander of the US 327th Glider Infantry Regiment interpreted it to the German truce party as "Go to hell!"

Despite the defiant American response to the surrender demand, the 26th VG received one Panzergrenadier regiment from the 15th Panzergrenadier Division on Christmas Eve for its main assault the next day. That night, at about 7:00 PM, Luftwaffe bombers attacked Bastogne, killing 21 in an aid station. Because it lacked sufficient troops and those of the 26th VG Division were near exhaustion, the XLVII Panzer Corps concentrated its assault on several individual locations on the west side of the perimeter in sequence rather than launching one simultaneous attack on all sides. The assault—led by 18 tanks carrying a battalion of infantry—pierced the lines of the 327th's 3rd Battalion (officially, the 1st Battalion, 401st Glider Infantry), and advanced as far as the battalion command post at Hemroulle.

However, the 327th held its original positions and repulsed infantry assaults that followed, capturing 92 Germans. The panzers that had achieved the penetration divided into two columns, one trying to reach Champs from the rear, and were destroyed in detail by two companies of the 1st Battalion 502nd PIR under Lt. Col. Patrick F. Cassidy and four tank destroyers of the 705th Tank Destroyer Battalion.

Allied control of Bastogne was a major obstacle to the German armored advance, and the morale of Allied forces elsewhere on the Western Front was boosted by news of the stubborn defense of the besieged town.

=== Breaking the encirclement ===
An in-depth analysis of the Battle of Bastogne, focusing on the ability of a light division to defeat heavier ones, leads to predictable conclusions. At Bastogne, well-coordinated combined arms teams defeated uncoordinated armored and infantry forces committed to an unrealistic plan. Results of isolated cases in which American infantry fought German armored forces point out how important the attached package of tanks and tank destroyers was to the 101st. Without them, even the bravest of infantry actions would have been no match for the tanks. The infantry, fighting alone, would have lost Bastogne early in the battle. Coordinated German attacks in mass, rather than the small unit attacks they employed, might also have resulted in a decisive German victory over the 101st and its attachments.

— Ralph M. Mitchell (1986), 101st Airborne Division's defense of Bastogne, p. 44

Elements of Patton's Third Army succeeded in reaching Bastogne from the southwest, arriving from the direction of Assenois. The spearhead reached the lines of the 326th Engineers on 26 December, Cobra King being the first tank to make contact at approximately 16:50. The 101st's ground communications with the American supply dumps were restored on 27 December, and the wounded were evacuated to the rear. Taylor reached Bastogne with the 4th Armored Division and resumed command.

Although Bastogne would be the scene of fierce fighting for several more weeks, with the break of the encirclement the siege period was over.

== Aftermath ==
The 101st Airborne Division's casualties from 19 December 1944 to 6 January 1945 were 341 killed, 1,691 wounded, and 516 missing. Several regiments within the 101st were nicknamed "The Battered Bastards of Bastogne", due to their part in holding the important crossroads town during the Battle of the Bulge. For its defense of Bastogne, the headquarters of the 101st Airborne Division was awarded the Presidential Unit Citation (PUC), with a streamer, embroidered BASTOGNE, for the division's colors. Also, the division was awarded the Belgian Croix de Guerre 1940 with Palm, Streamer embroidered BASTOGNE, and cited in the Order of the Day of the Belgian Army for action at Bastogne.

The 10th Armored Division's Combat Command B incurred approximately 500 casualties. The 10th Armored Division's Combat Command B and 21st Tank Battalion were awarded the Presidential Unit Citation (PUC) for their actions at Bastogne. Years after the war, McAuliffe said "In my opinion, Combat Command B of the 10th Armored Division was never properly credited with their important role in the Bastogne battle."

Augusta Chiwy, a nurse who administered aid to the wounded during the siege, was honored with the Civilian Award for Humanitarian Service by the US Ambassador to Belgium Howard Gutman in December 2011.

== Gallery ==
Map of troop movements during the battle of the Bulge. Bastogne is near the middle.

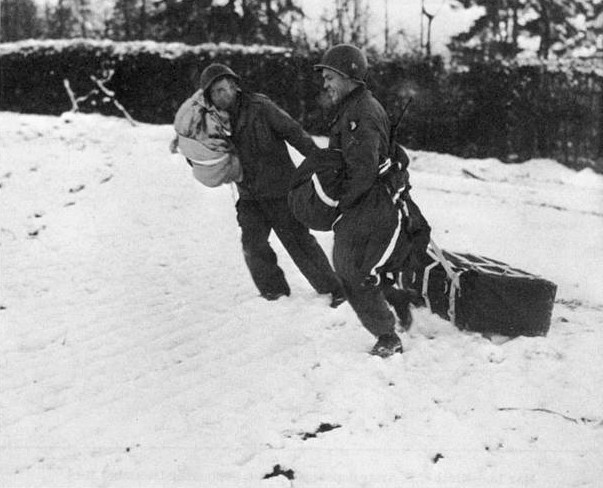
101st Airborne troops picking up air-dropped supplies during the siege.

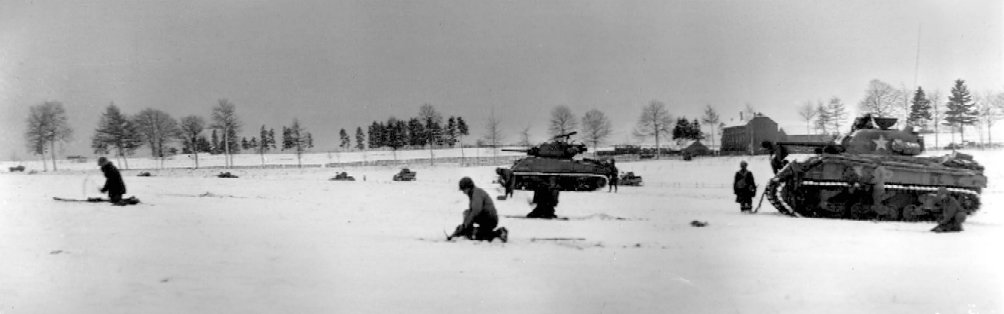
Soldiers of the 44th Armored Infantry Battalion, 6th Armored Division near Bastogne, 31 December 1944

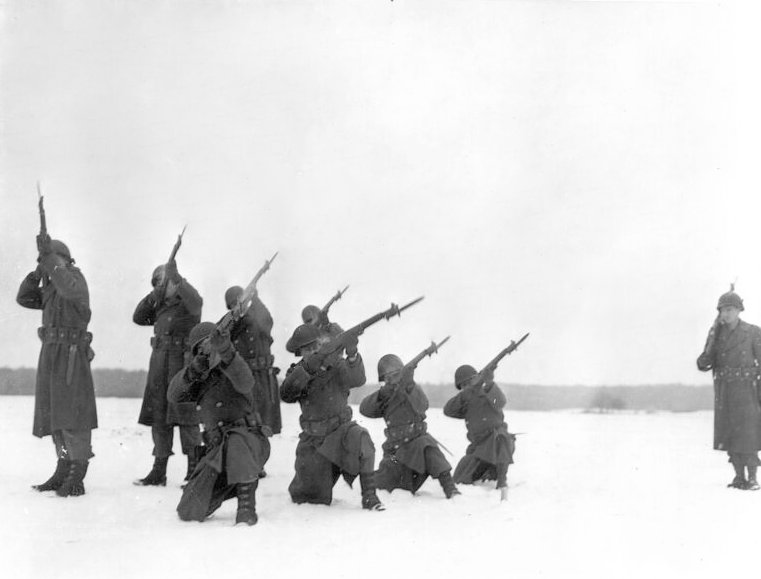
Members of C Company, 9th Engineers, conduct a memorial service for those killed during the siege, 22 January 1945.

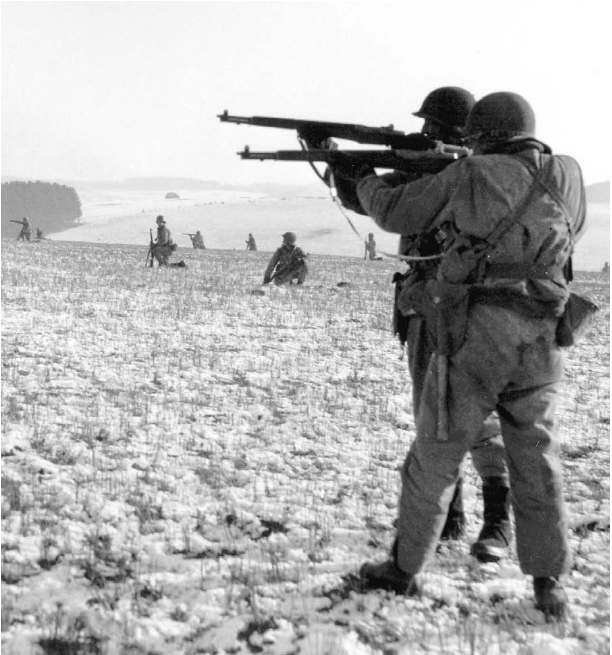
Infantry of relief force near Bastogne, December 1944.

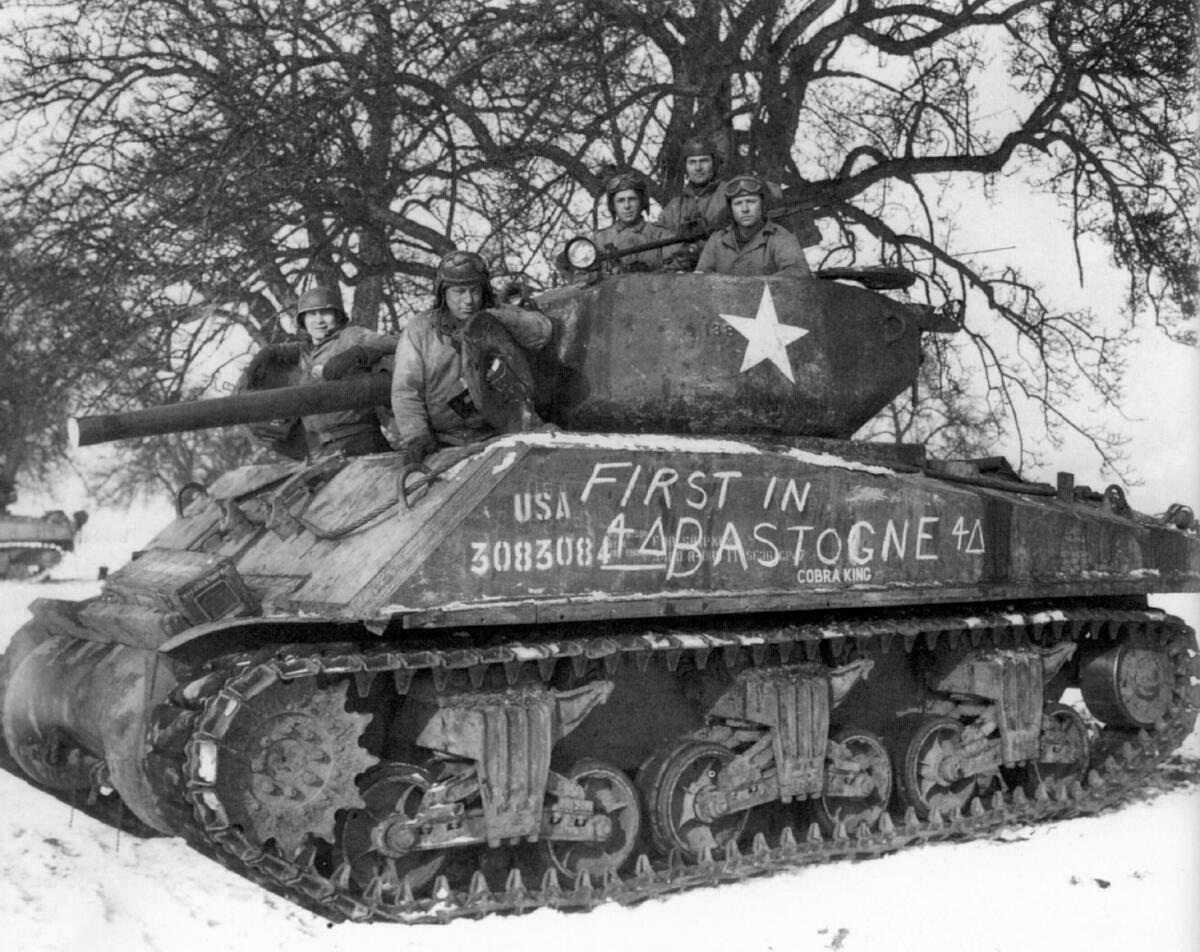
The crew of the M4A3E2 'Cobra King' poses for a celebratory photo
