= Foy, Belgium =

Foy
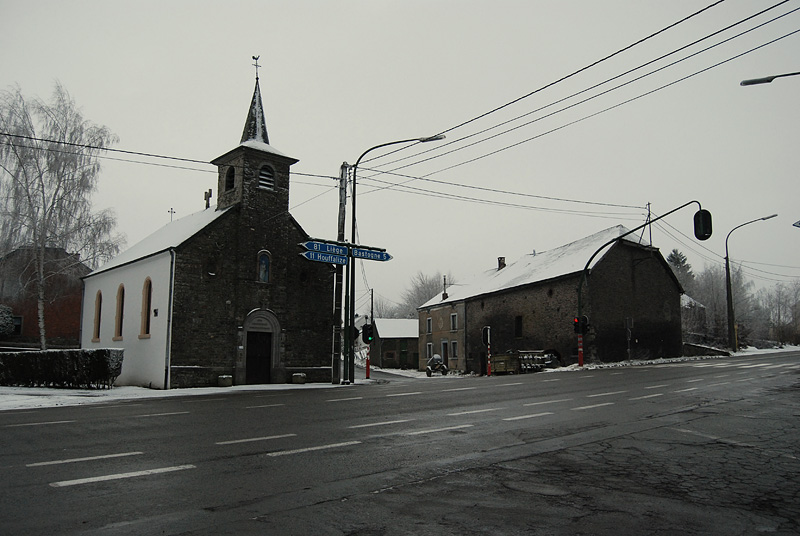
- St. Barbara Chapel, December 2008

- Location in Belgium
- Coordinates: 50°03′N 05°45′E
- Country: Belgium
- Region: Wallonia
- Province: Luxembourg
- Municipality: Bastogne

Population (1 January 2008)
  - Total: 192
- Postal codes: 6600
- Area codes: 061

Foy (pronounced [fwa]) is a village of Wallonia in the municipality of Bastogne, district of Noville, Bastogne, located in the province of Luxembourg in the Ardennes, Belgium.

== Background ==
Foy is in the Ardennes Forest region, an area of more than 11,000 square kilometers. It is largely in what today is Wallonia, the French-speaking area of southern Belgium, but it extends into France, Germany, and Luxembourg.

== Battle of the Bulge ==
In World War II, most of Foy was occupied by German forces during the Battle of the Bulge. The U.S. 101st Airborne Division held the Bois Jacques just outside town. After being relieved by General George S. Patton's U.S. Third Army, the 101st retook the town.

A monument to the American paratroopers was built in 2004 at the edge of the Bois Jacques, south of Foy.

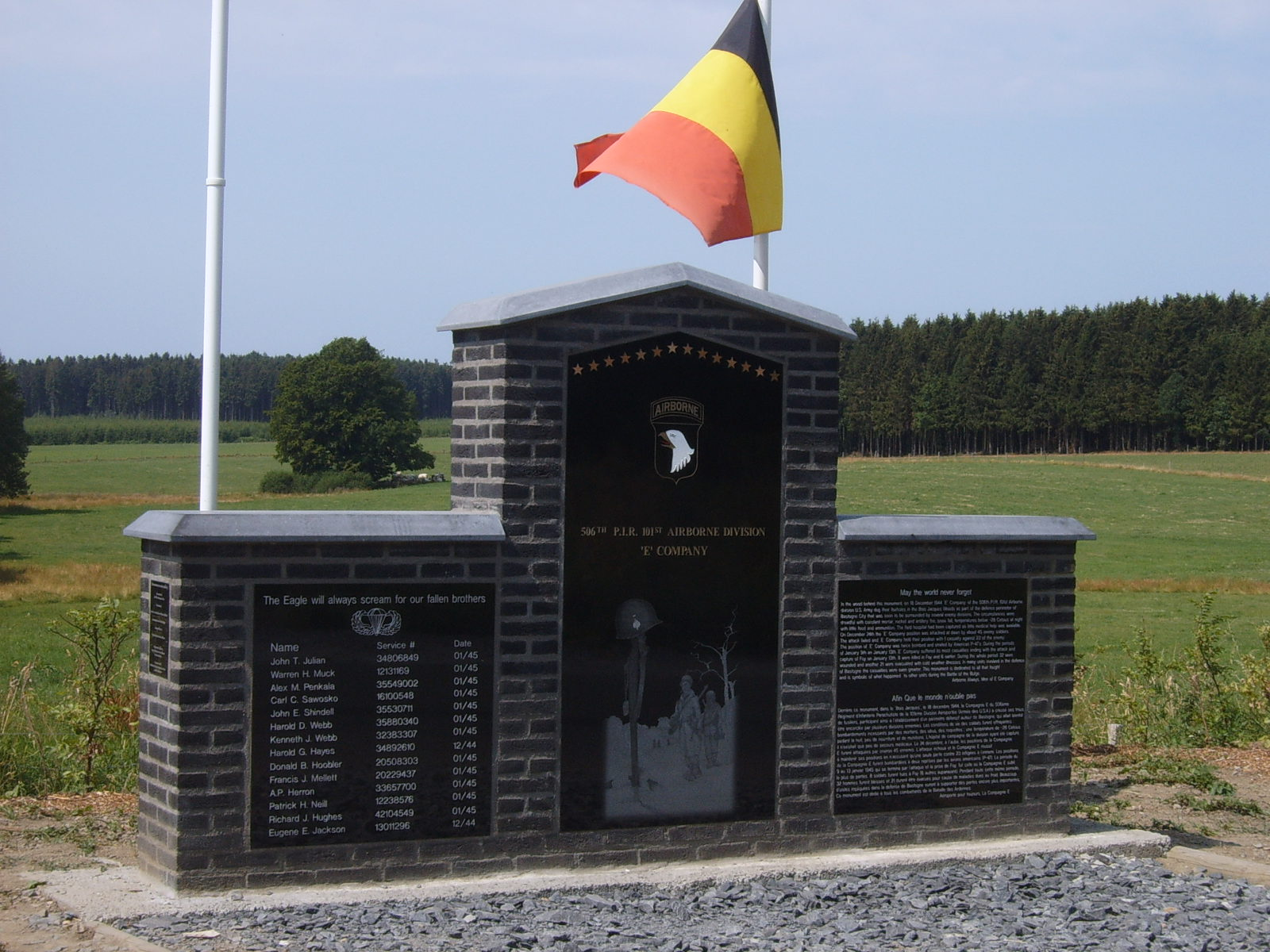
Monument for Easy Company

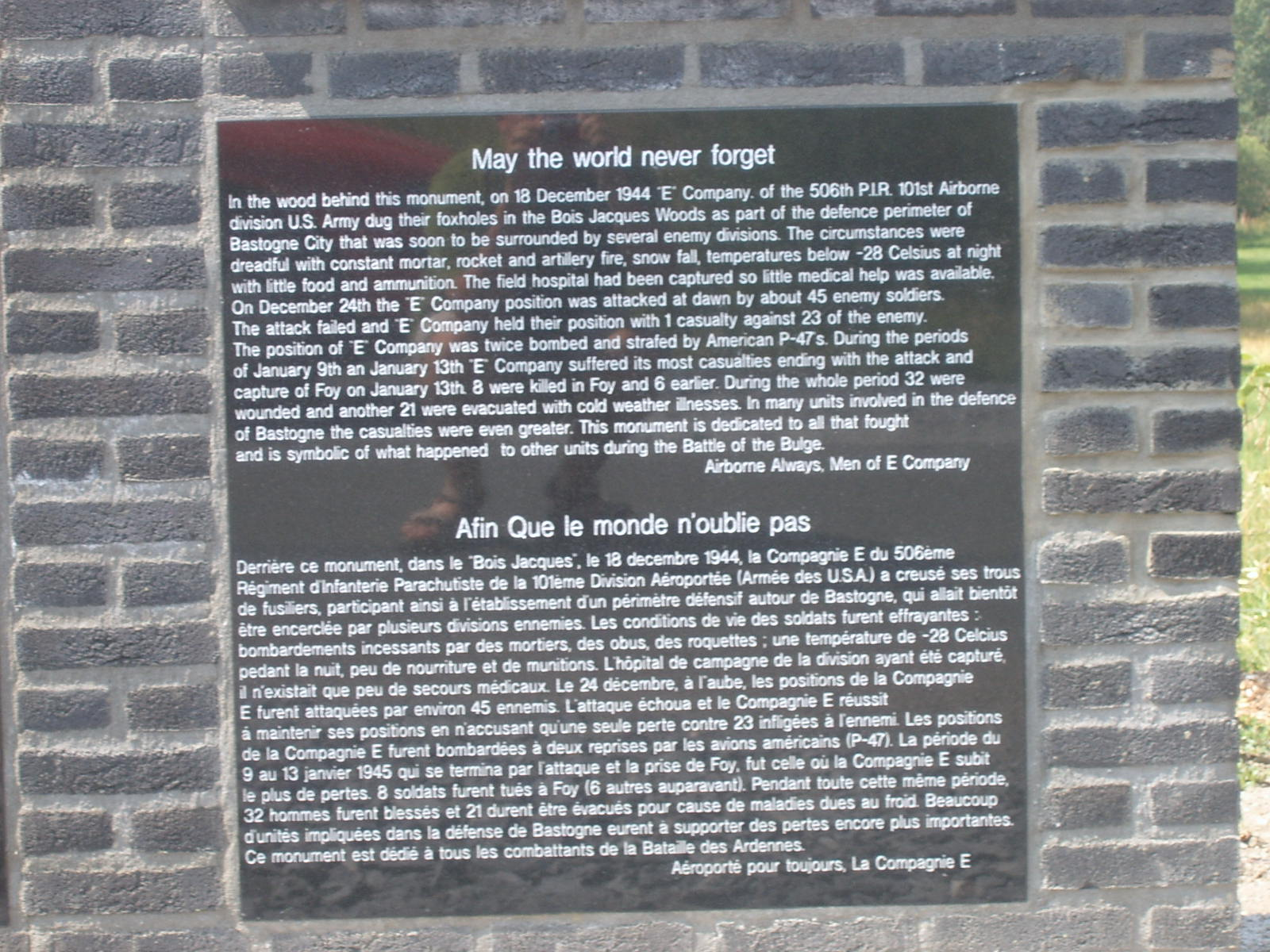
Monument for Easy Company, detail

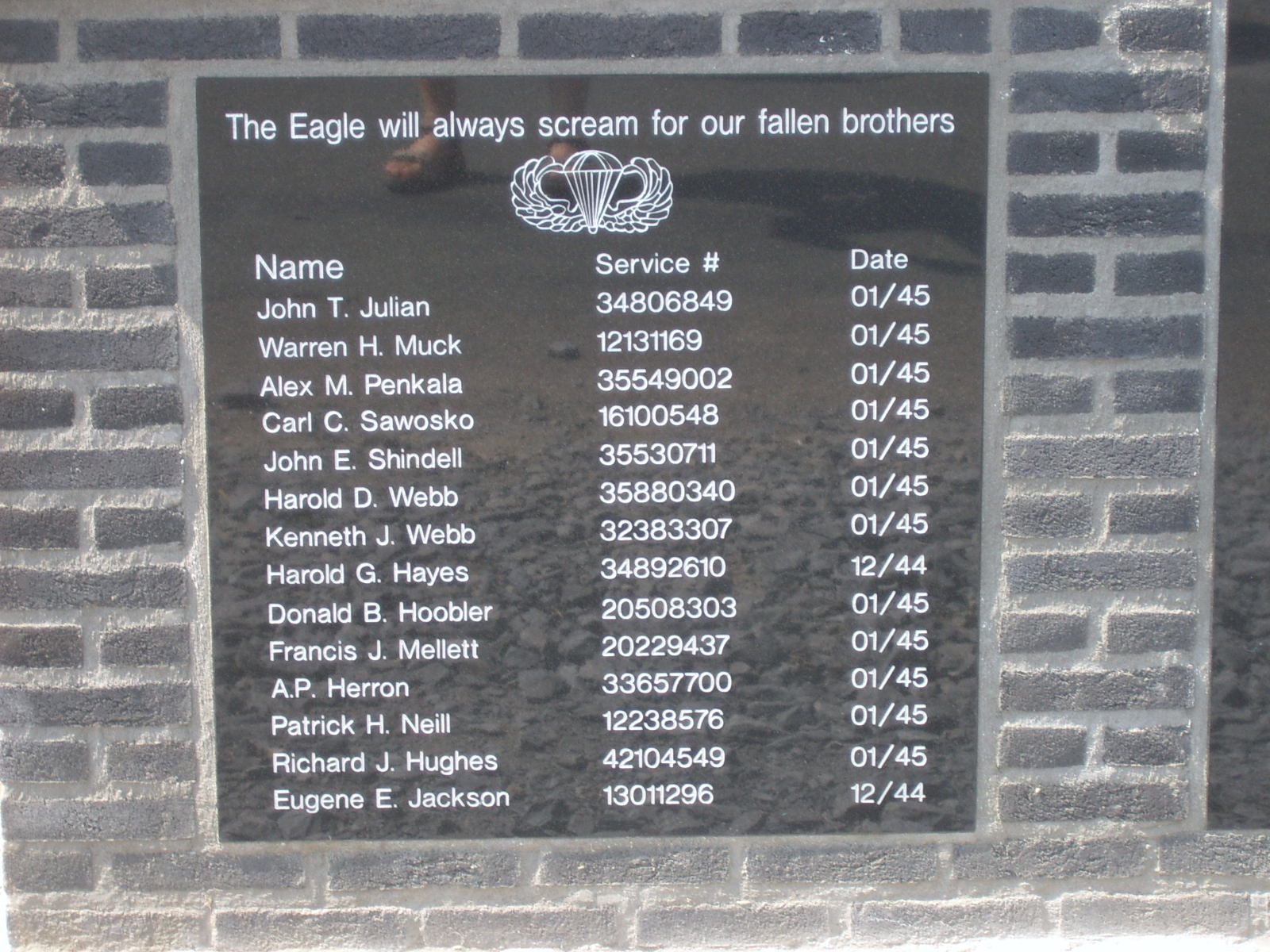
Monument for Easy Company, detail

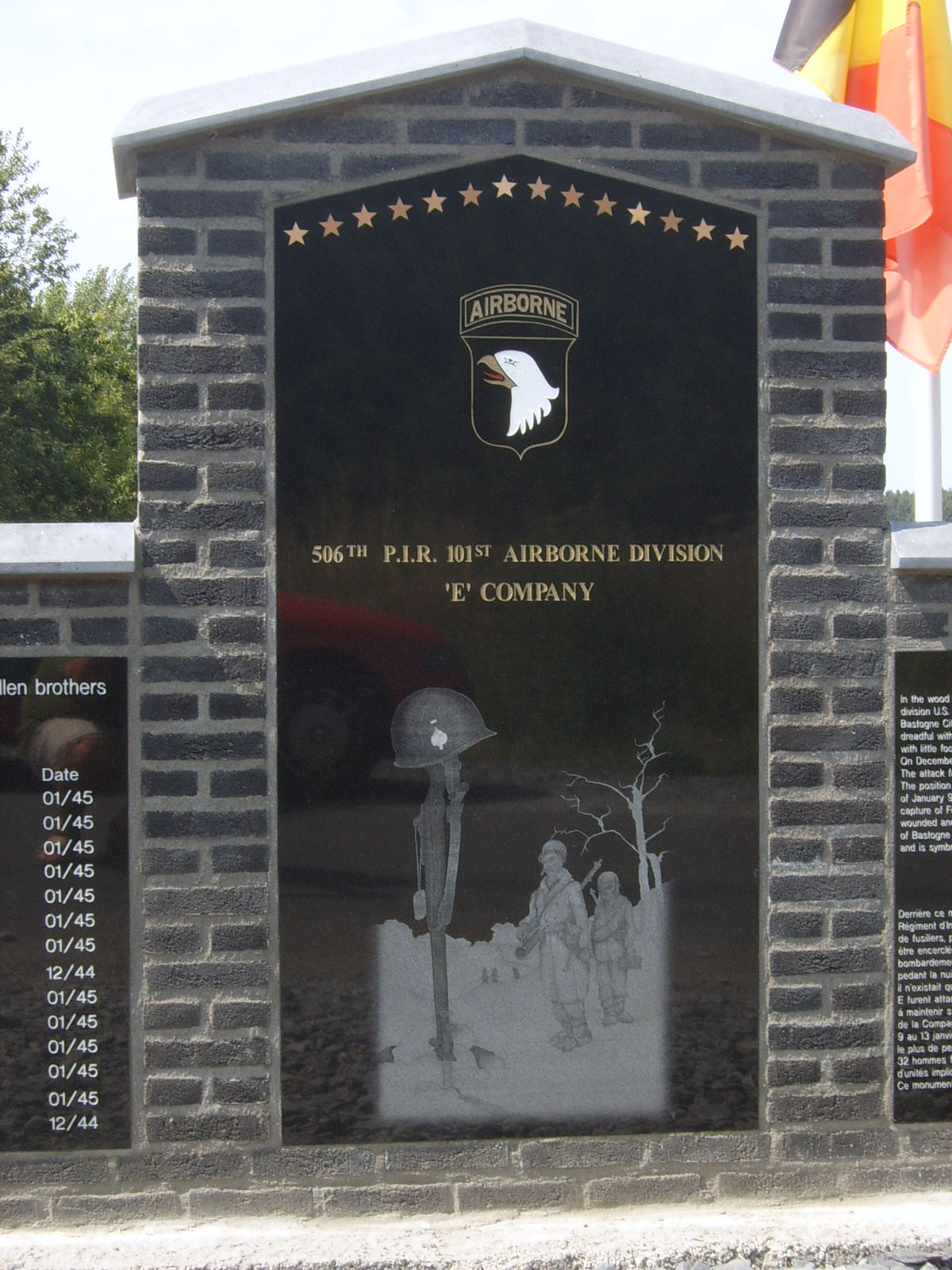
Monument for Easy Company, detail

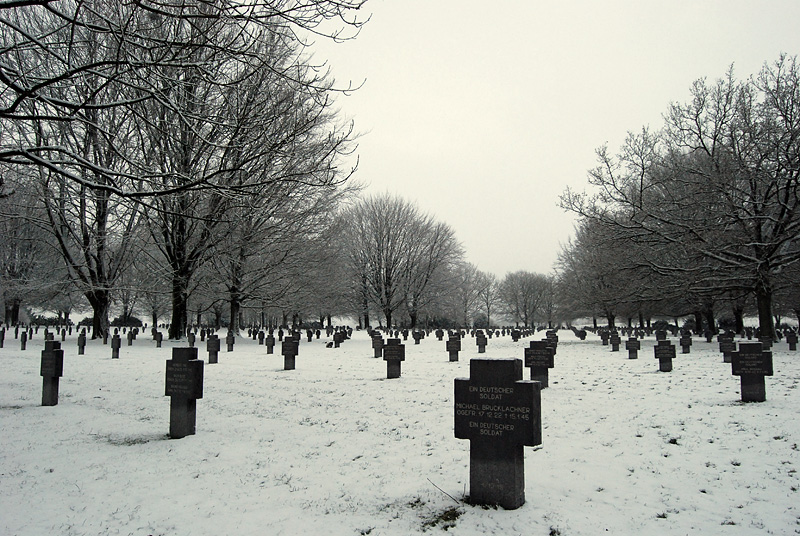
German cemetery

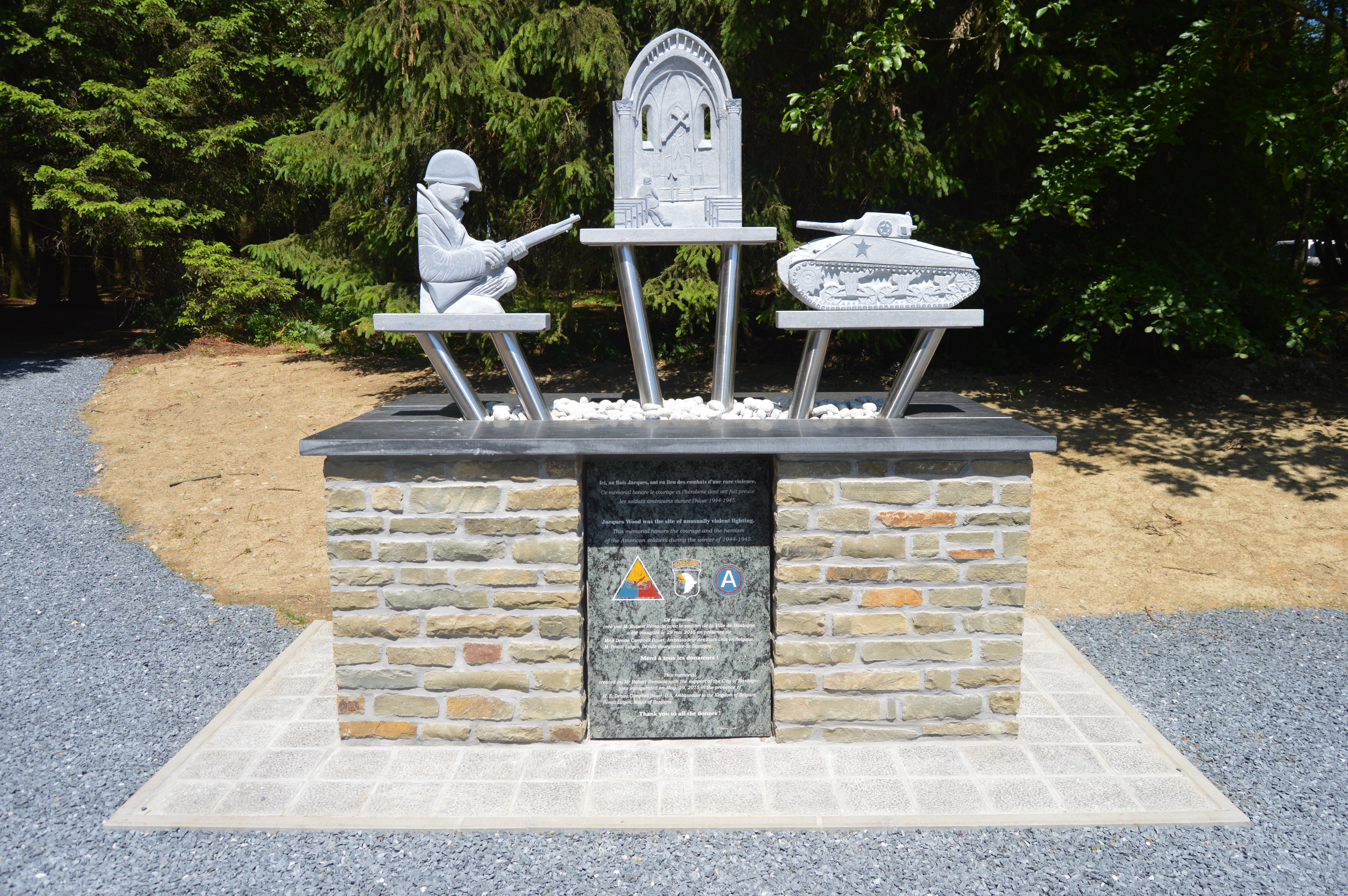
Memorial Bois Jacques

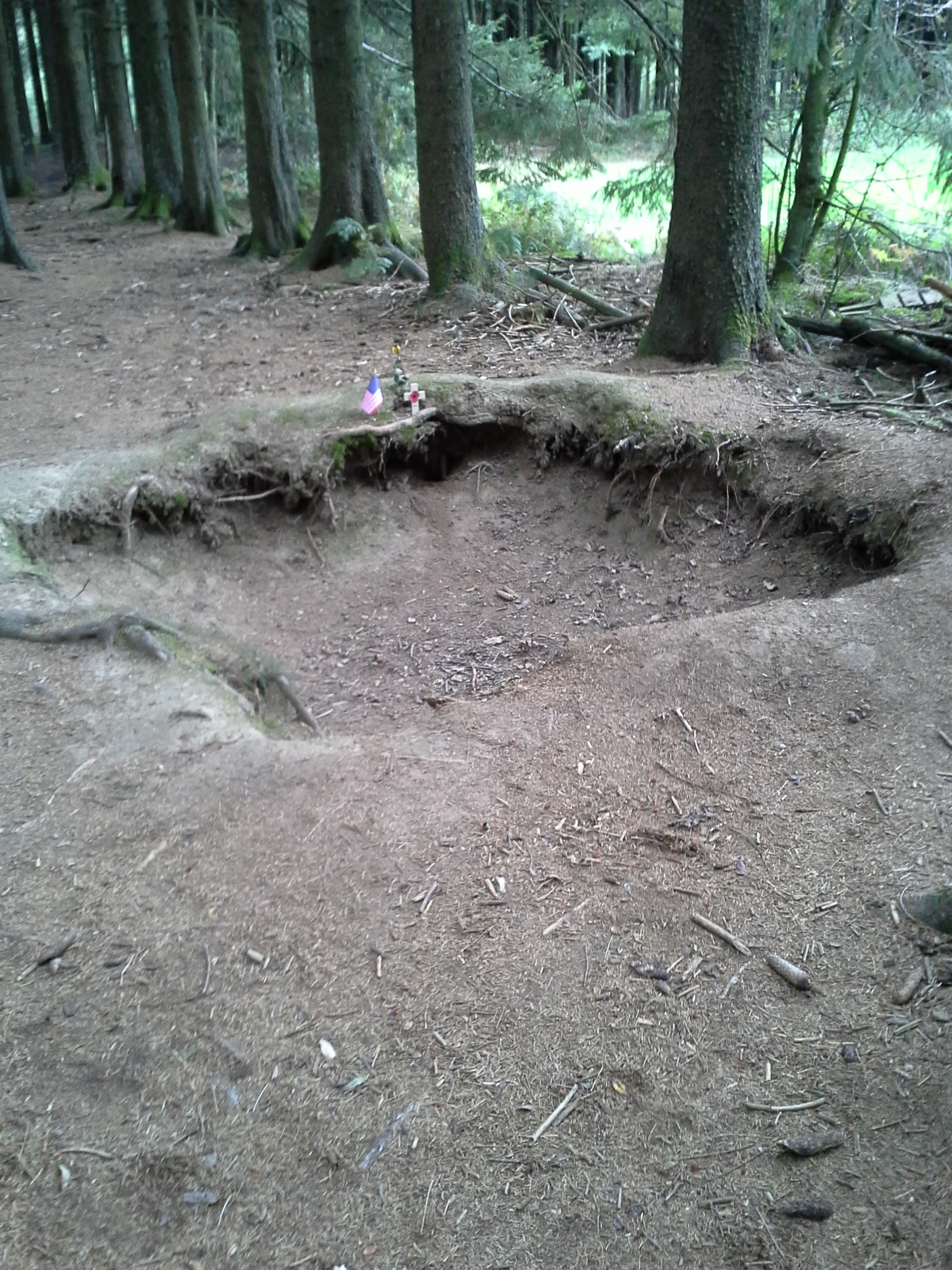
Foxholes Bois Jacques
