= Minister of Agriculture (Belgium) =

The Agriculture Minister of Belgium is the political minister office responsible for agriculture. In 2001, the Regions became mainly responsible for agriculture as part of the fifth state reform.

== List of ministers ==
=== Federal government ===
Ministers in the Belgian Federal Government:

- 1981-1992 : Paul De Keersmaeker (CVP)
- 1992-1995 : André Bourgeois (CVP)
- 1995-1999 : Karel Pinxten (CVP)
- 1999 : Herman Van Rompuy (CVP)
- 1999-2001 : Jaak Gabriëls (VLD)
- 2001-2003 : Annemie Neyts (VLD)
- 2003-2014: Sabine Laruelle (MR)
- 2014-2017: Willy Borsus (MR)
- 2017-Present: Denis Ducarme (MR)

=== Flanders ===
Ministers in the Flemish Government:

- 1995-1999 : Eric Van Rompuy (Christian People's Party, CVP)
- 1999-2003 : Vera Dua (Groen!)
- 2003-2004 : Ludo Sannen (Groen!)
- 2004 : Jef Tavernier (Groen!)
- 2004-2007 : Yves Leterme (Christian Democratic and Flemish, CD&V)
- 2007-2014 : Kris Peeters (CD&V)
- 2014 - present : Joke Schauvliege (CD&V)

=== Wallonia ===
Ministers in the Walloon Government:

- 1985-1988 : Daniel Ducarme (Liberal Reformist Party, PRL)
- 1988-1992 : Guy Lutgen (Christian Social Party, PSC)
- 1992-1995 : Guy Lutgen (Christian Social Party, PSC)
- 1995-1999 : Guy Lutgen (Christian Social Party, PSC)
- 1999-2004 : José Happart (Socialist Party, PS)
- 2004-2009 : Benoît Lutgen (Humanist Democratic Centre, CDH)
- 2009-2011 : Benoît Lutgen (Humanist Democratic Centre, CDH)
- 2011-2014 : Carlo Di Antonio (Humanist Democratic Centre, CDH)
- 2014- : René Collin (Humanist Democratic Centre, CDH)
