= Bastogne War Museum =

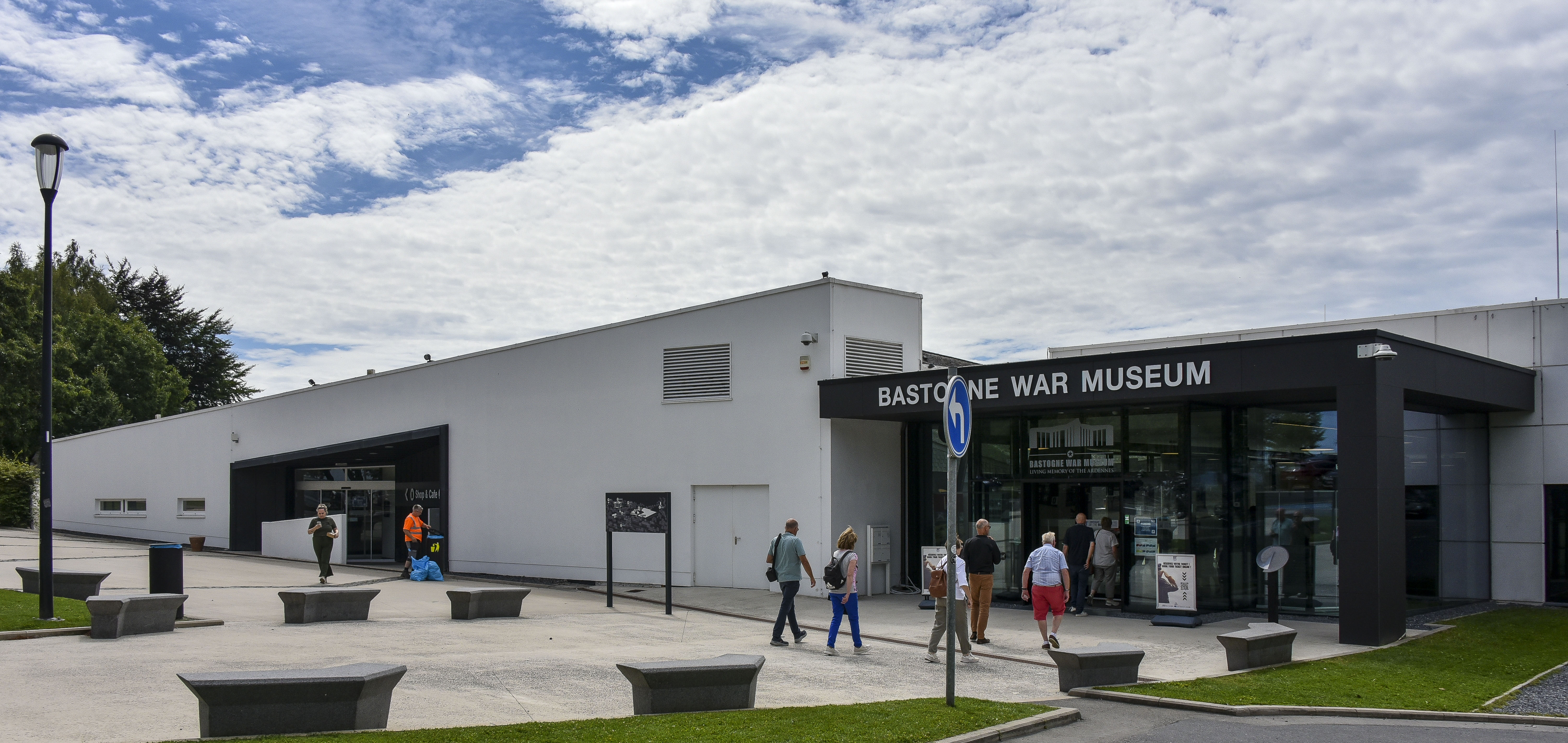
Entrance of the Bastogne War Museum

The Bastogne War Museum is a Second World War museum located in Belgium, in the province of Luxembourg, north of the town of Bastogne, next to the Battle of the Bulge Monument (former name "Mardasson Memorial"). The museum is primarily dedicated to the Battle of the Bulge.

The tour includes visits to three sites — the Bastogne War Museum, the Bois Jacques Battlefield ("Jack Wood") and the Bastogne War Rooms — which together trace the events that took place during the Battle of the Bulge in Bastogne. These sites offer a modern and interactive perspective on the causes, events and consequences of the Second World War, with a particular focus on the Battle of the Ardennes.

== History of the Museum ==
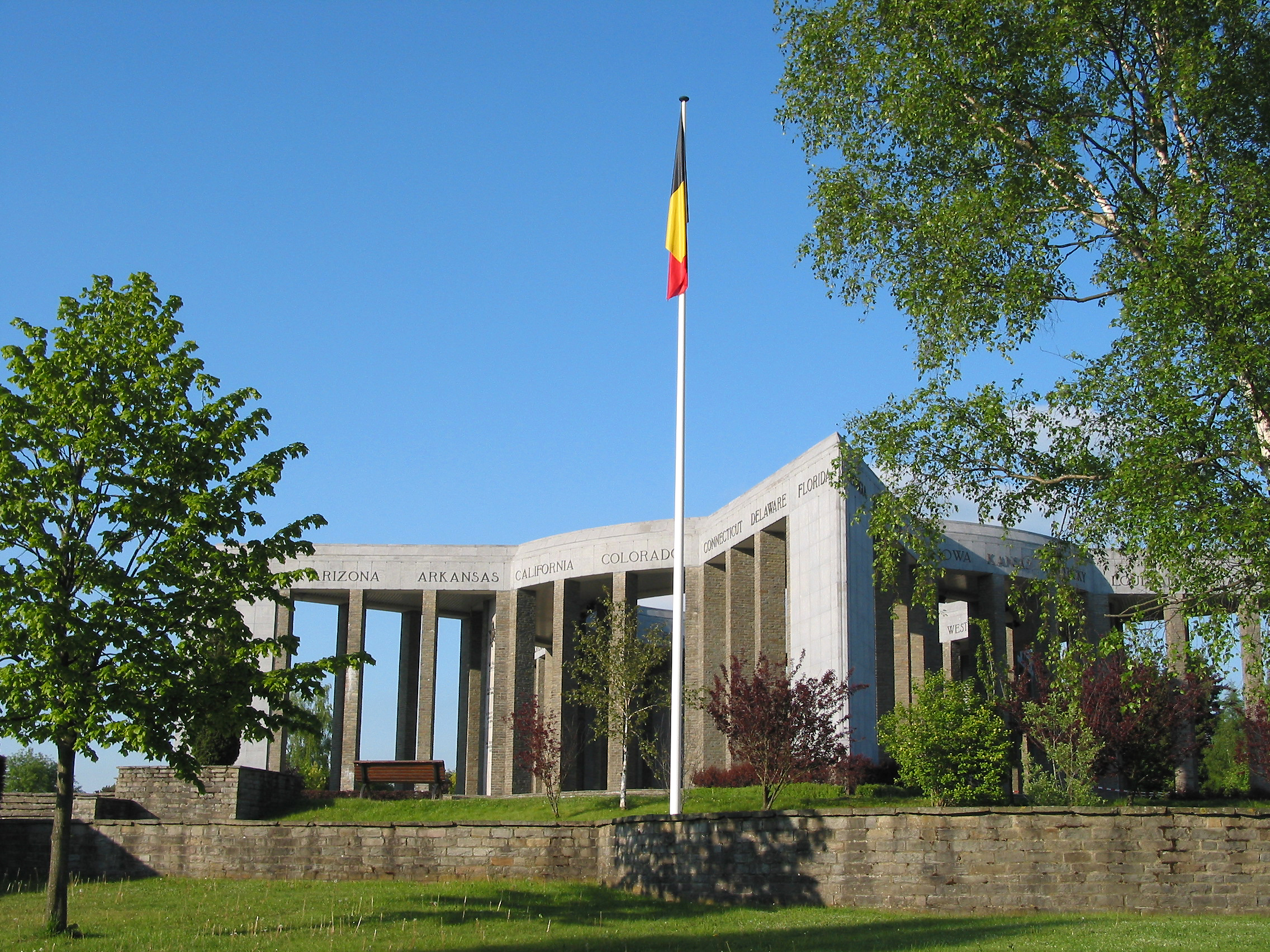
The Battle of the Bulge Monument

The Bastogne War Museum is situated on Mardasson Hill, in the immediate vicinity of the Battle of the Bulge Monument (former name "Mardasson Memorial"), which was unveiled on 16 July 1950 in the presence of General Anthony McAuliffe. The memorial is dedicated to the American soldiers who fought in the Battle of the Bulge during the winter of 1944–1945.

Before the current museum opened, the site used by the Bastogne Historical Center, a museum dedicated to the Second World War and, more specifically, to the Battle of the Bulge, which opened in 1976. Housed in a building shaped like an American star, it displayed a significant collection of artefacts, weapons, vehicles and memorabilia relating to the fighting of 1944–1945. The museum closed its doors in 2009 to make way for the construction of a new facility.

A renovation and extension project was then undertaken by the City of Bastogne, the place’s owner, in partnership with the Belgian company Tempora, which was responsible for the design and operation of the future museum. The Intermunicipal Association Idelux is also involved in the project. Funding comes notably from the Walloon Region and the European Regional Development Fund (ERDF). The project planned to retain the star-shaped structure of the Bastogne Historical Centre and integrate it into a new building.

The Bastogne War Museum opened to the public on 22 March 2014. It replaced the Bastogne Historical Centre and became the main museum dedicated to the Battle of the Bulge in Belgium.

A Sherman tank on display at the Bastogne War Museum

This evolution and momentum continue with the addition, in 2022, of two new immersive experiences. At the Bastogne War Museum site, the ‘Generations45’ exhibition explores the post-war years. A few kilometres away from the Bastogne War Museum, the Bois Jacques – a historic battlefield – can be explored using an augmented reality mobile app.

The expansion of Bastogne’s museum offering continues in 2024 with the opening of the Bastogne War Rooms, housed in the former Heintz military barracks in Bastogne town centre.

Since it opened, the museum has welcomed over 1.7 million visitors – around 150,000 per year – making it Belgium’s leading centre for the Second World War. Half of the visitors to the Bastogne War Museum come from abroad, including over 20,000 Americans.

== 4 visitor experiences across 3 historic sites ==
=== Bastogne War Museum & Generations45 ===
The main site offers two complementary visitor experiences. The permanent exhibition traces the history of the Second World War, and more specifically that of the Battle of the Bulge, through an audio-guided tour punctuated by three immersive, multi-sensory scenovisions. Throughout the visit, one follows and listens to the stories of four characters representing different perspectives on the conflict: Robert, an American corporal from the 101st Airborne Division; Hans, a German lieutenant from the 26th Volksgrenadier Division; Mathilde, a young schoolteacher from Bastogne and member of the Resistance; and Emilie, a child from Bastogne.

Featuring over 70 display cases, the exhibition is gathered thanks to private and public collections brought together for the occasion, as well as interactive terminals. At the end of the permanent exhibition, a life-size replica of a P-51 Mustang fighter aircraft is on display. This aircraft bears the livery of the plane flown by American Major George Preddy, who was shot down over the Ardennes in December 1944.

Volkswagen Kübelwagen présentée dans les salles d'exposition du Bastogne War Museum

Opened in 2022, ‘Generations45’ is a complementary audio-guided experience that traces the post-war journeys of two Second World War veterans: Sergio, an American veteran, and Karl, a German veteran. Thanks to their personal stories, visitors (re)discover the major events that shaped Europe and the world from 1945 to 1989.

==== Bistrot de la Paix ====
The Bastogne War Museum also offers a range of visitor services, which are available during the museum’s opening hours and free from entrance fee.

The Bistrot de la Paix is decorated in a style inspired by 1950s cafés, it can seat up to 140 people. It serves Belgian meals such as Liège-style meatballs, vol-au-vent and waffles. Vegetarian options are also available on the menu. The bistro also features a south-facing outdoor terrace, from which you can view the Battle of the Bulge Monument.

A shop is located at the end of the tour route. It sells books, clothing, souvenirs and various items relating to the Second World War and the Battle of the Bulge.

=== Bois Jacques Battlefield ===
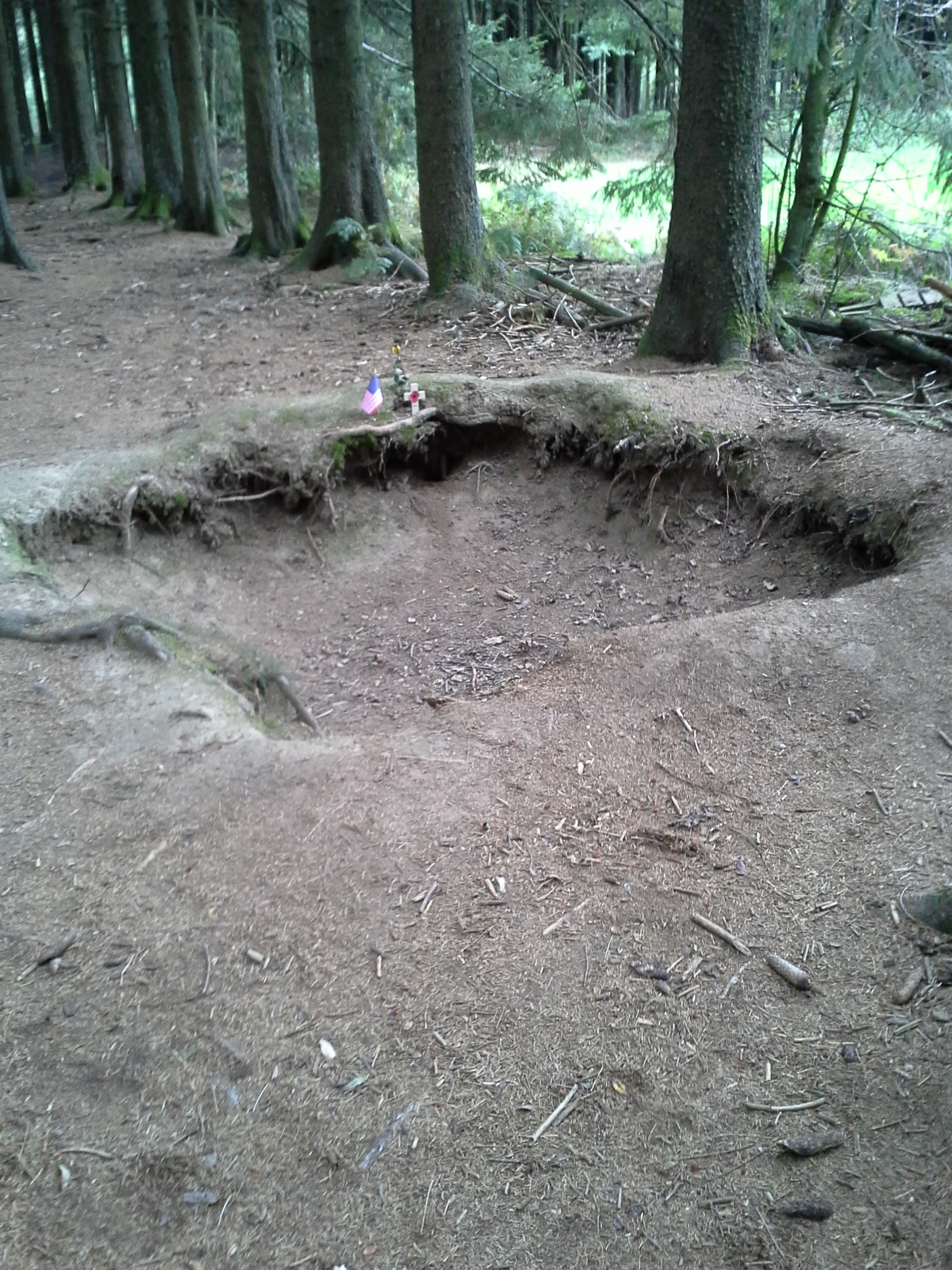
One foxhole in the Bois Jacques

The ‘Bois Jacques Battlefield’ exhibition is dedicated to life on the front line and the fighting that took place in this very forest during the Battle of Bastogne. The woods were occupied mainly by Easy Company of the 506th Parachute Infantry Regiment of the US 101st Airborne Division, made famous by the television series Band of Brothers. Remains of the defensive positions dug by American soldiers, commonly known as foxholes, are still visible on the site.

An augmented reality mobile app for smartphones allows visitors to discover the soldiers’ daily lives through six immersive 360° videos, which are geolocated and available in several languages. This content showcases various aspects of the fighting and the soldiers’ lives in Bois Jacques, with historical information provided by the YouTuber ‘Nota Béné’.

=== Bastogne War Rooms ===
The Bastogne War Rooms is a museum and memorial site dedicated to the Battle of the Bulge and the history of Bastogne during the Second World War. The museum is located in one of the military buildings of the former Heintz barracks, built in the heart of Bastogne in 1933. During the Battle of the Bulge, the barracks served as headquarters for the American forces during the siege of Bastogne. The site notably includes the ‘McAuliffe Cellar’, a cellar in which, on 22 December 1944, US General Anthony McAuliffe replied ‘NUTS!’ to the German demand for surrender.

Photograph taken from the former military barracks in Bastogne

On the ground floor, the exhibition presents the history of the barracks prior to its occupation by the US Army, then traces the key events of the Battle of the Bulge using large interactive tables displaying military maps. The exhibition covers, in particular, the German offensive launched in December 1944 as well as the fighting that continued into January 1945. The exhibition also displays original artefacts found in the villages affected by the fighting, bearing witness to the soldiers’ living conditions during the winter of 1944–1945.

In the cellars, visitors experience, hour by hour, the events of 22 December 1944 through four films depicting the key moments of the day in the Battle of the Bulge.

== Battle of the Bulge Monument ==
The Battle of the Bulge Monument (formerly known as the Mardasson Memorial) is a monument situated on a hill of the Mardasson, approximately two kilometres north-east of the centre of Bastogne and a few metres away from the entrance to the Bastogne War Museum.

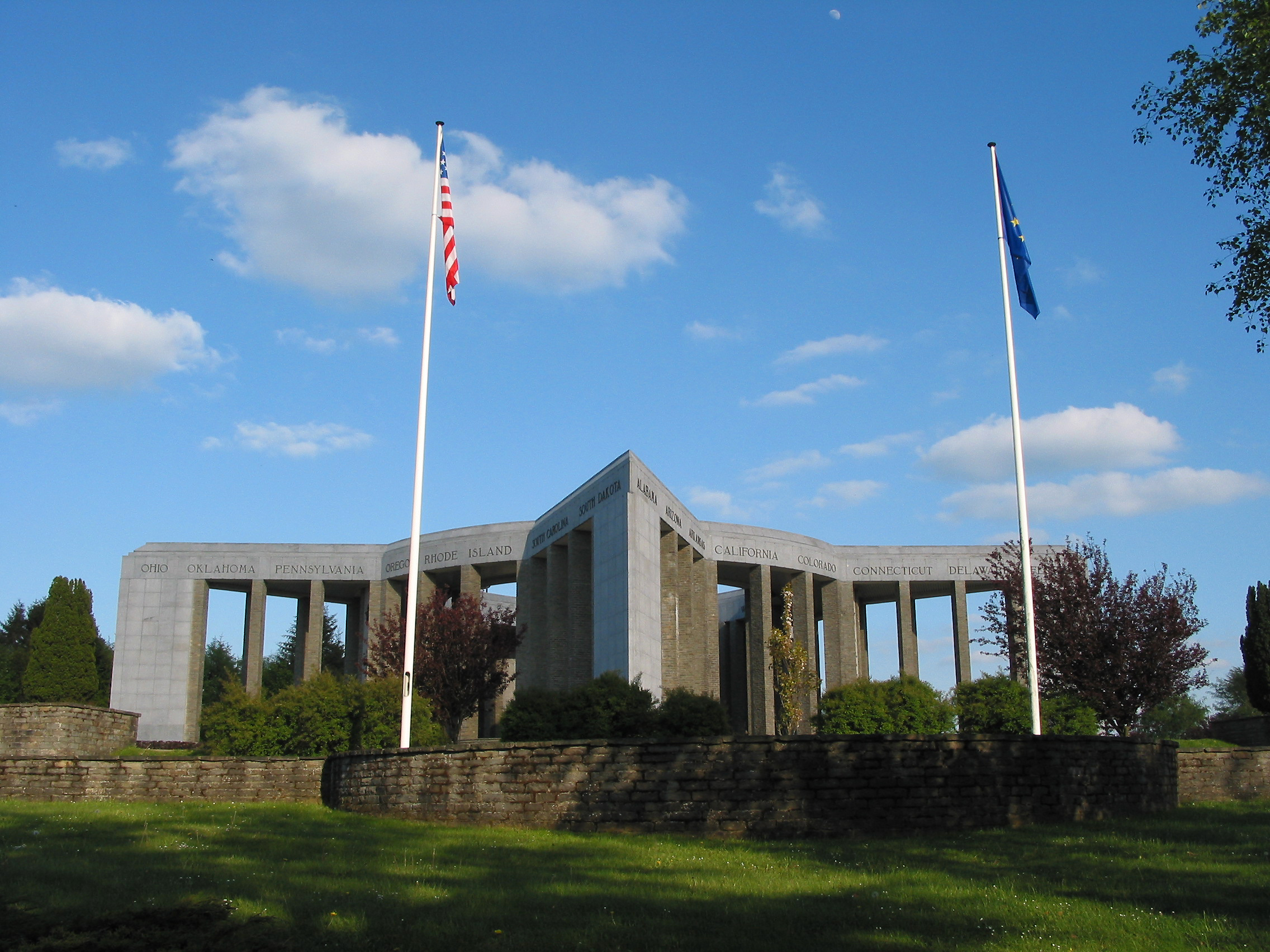
Battle of the Bulge Monument

Unveiled in 1950, it stands as a testament to the Belgian people’s gratitude towards the American soldiers who fought in the Battle of the Bulge during the winter of 1944–1945. The monument was built to a design by the architect Georges Dedoyard, on a natural rise. Its star-shaped design evokes the symbol of the Allied troops during the liberation campaign as well as the American flag. The names of the American States are inscribed on the outer and inner faces of the monument.

At the end of 2020, Belgium transferred the management and maintenance of the monument to the American Battle Monuments Commission, an agency of the US government.

A crypt situated near the Battle of the Bulge Monument houses three altars dedicated respectively to the Catholic, Protestant and Jewish faiths – the three religions most widely represented in the United States of America during the early post-war years. Each is adorned with a mosaic created by the French artist Fernand Léger.

The Battle of the Bulge Monument is situated in the immediate vicinity of the Bastogne War Museum and can be seen from the terrace of the museum’s bistro.

== Major events ==
=== Nuts Weekend ===
The ‘Nuts Weekend’ is an annual event commemorating the Battle of the Bulge, organised by the Town of Bastogne around mid-December. This weekend of festivities attracts numerous visitors every year. Its name refers to the phrase ‘NUTS!’, which US General Anthony McAuliffe is said to have used in response to the German demand for surrender during the siege of Bastogne. Originally organised before the Bastogne War Museum opened, the event now involves the museum, as well as the town’s other memorial sites.

To mark the occasion, the museum organises various free activities such as meetings and personal accounts from Second World War veterans, official ceremonies, exhibition openings, historical military camps, static displays of period military vehicles, talks, book signings, workshops for young people, and meet-and-greets with actors from the series Band of Brothers, etc.

During anniversary editions, sound-and-light shows, directed by Luc Petit, have also been organised at the Battle of the Bulge Monument. Notably, in 2014, to mark the 70th anniversary of the Battle of the Bulge; in 2019, for its 75th anniversary; and in 2024, for its 80th anniversary.

=== Memorial Day ===
The museum helps to organise, with the help of the Town of Bastogne, the Memorial Day ceremony, which takes place every year on the last weekend of May in tribute to the American soldiers who died during the Battle of the Bulge. The ceremony is held at the Bois de la Paix or at the Battle of the Bulge Monument, in the presence of representatives of the American and Belgian armed forces.

=== Colloquia and lectures ===
Since 2016, the museum has organised an international colloquium entitled ‘Rendez-vous au Bastogne War Museum’, bringing together renowned speakers to discuss topical issues in international geopolitics. This usually takes place during spring.

The first edition, in 2016, was entitled “The Glory and Misery of War Journalism” and featured Florence Aubenas, Bernard-Henri Lévy and other experts on the subject.

The second edition, in 2018, was entitled “Terrorism. Are We at War?”, attended by Manuel Valls, former French Prime Minister, Régis Debray and other experts on the subject.

The third edition, in 2019, was entitled “From One Cold War to Another?”, attended by Daniel Cohn-Bendit, Hélène Carrère d’Encause and other experts on the subject.

The fourth edition, in 2023, was entitled “Are we still capable of defending ourselves? Democracy in the face of its enemies”, attended by Guy Verhofstadt, former Belgian Prime Minister, Melchior Wathelet, Colette Braeckman and other experts on the subject.

The fifth edition, in 2024, was entitled “The West: Why So Much Hatred?”, attended by François Hollande, former President of the French Republic, Elie Barnavi, Slimane Zeghidour and other experts on the subject.

The 6th edition, in 2025, was entitled “What is a just war?”, attended by Bernard Kouchner, former French Minister of State, Annette Wieviorka and other experts on the subject.

The 7th edition, held in 2026, was entitled “Is Europe at war?”, and was attended by Clément Beaune, Edwy Plenel, Alain Frachon and other experts on the subject.

=== "War as I saw it" ===
Since September 2025, the museum has also been organising a series of talks entitled ‘War as I Saw It’, giving a platform to professionals who have experienced war-torn situations first-hand. The first event featured the photographer and war correspondent Patrick Chauvel.

== Educational activities ==
Since its opening, the museum has offered educational programmes aimed at pupils in primary, secondary and higher education, led by guides who have previously worked as teachers. Several themed tours are available, tailored to the pupils’ ages.

A tour for pupils aged 6 to 13, centred on the character of Émile, explores key aspects of civilian life during the Second World War (ration cards, curfews, how schools were organised during the occupation, etc.). The ‘Jeu des Alliés’, a treasure hunt near the Battle of the Bulge Monument, rounds off the day at the museum.

For secondary school pupils, three activities are available.

A tour dedicated to exile, entitled ‘Routes d’Exil’, for pupils aged 13 and over. A role-play taking the form of a mock trial and addressing the legal issues of the time, for those aged 15 and over. This role-play takes place in a replica wartime court set up in a room within the museum. And, finally, a tour dedicated to human rights, for those aged 15 and over.

Workshops for children organised during the school holidays, as well as a four-day programme entitled ‘Citizenship Classes’, launched in 2025, round off the museum’s educational activities.

=== Bastogne Youth for Remembrance ===
Since 2019, the museum has also been organising the ‘Bastogne Youth for Remembrance’ competition, aimed at final-year secondary school pupils from all schools in Wallonia. In the morning, the pupils take part in a guided tour of the Bastogne War Museum with a specific focus. In the afternoon, they take part in a debate with experts in the field. Following their day in Bastogne, the teenagers submit a group project to a panel of judges selected by the Museum. In 2026, the chosen theme was the risks of disinformation in traditional and new media, with journalists in attendance.

== Documentation Centre & Historical Archive ==
The Bastogne War Museum receives daily offers of donations or loans of period artefacts. These requests are handled not by the museum itself, but by the non-profit organisation Bastogne Memorial WW2 Reference Centre, which is responsible for the conservation of the museum’s collections as well as for an archive and documentation centre. This centre holds more than 8,000 documents (contemporary archives and later publications) relating to the Battle of the Ardennes, which are gradually being incorporated into a database to facilitate their preservation.

The centre’s collections and storage facilities are also enriched by donations in kind, mainly from families wishing to ensure the preservation of objects or documents that belonged to relatives who lived or fought in the Ardennes during the winter of 1944–1945. Since the opening of new storage facilities in 2022, these items have been gradually incorporated into them, whilst the documents have been added to the documentation centre.

Ultimately, the foundation hopes to open this centre to the public as a ‘WWII Reference Centre’, combining a physical space with an online database accessible to veterans’ families, researchers, schools and historians.

== Event rooms & B2B offerings ==
The Bastogne War Museum offers companies four venues to organise seminars, meetings, trade fairs, team-building activities and, more generally, corporate events.

The ‘Mustang Flight Zone’ is a reception hall that is unique in Belgium as it houses a full-scale replica of a P-51 Mustang fighter aircraft.

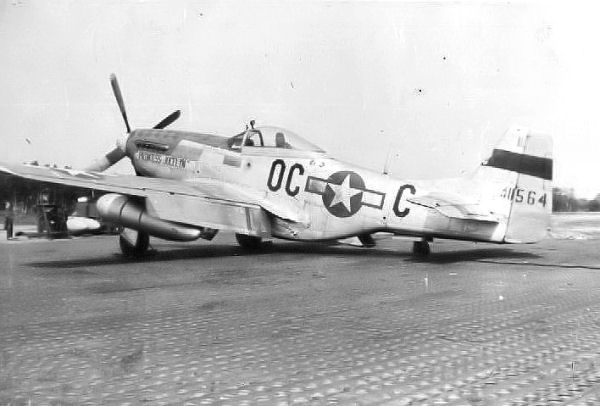
P-51 Mustang - Martlesham

The ‘Bastogne Convention Centre’ is a space of approximately 400 m² equipped with a large projection screen and sound systems ideal for public speaking to a large audience.

A meeting room is also available for smaller groups (up to 50 people) for meetings or daytime training sessions.

Finally, the Museum’s dining area, the Bistrot de la Paix, can be privatised in the evening (from 6.00 pm) for a team or club dinner (up to 140 guests).

=== Teambuilding in the Museum ===
Companies and non-profit organisations can also organise team-building events at the Bastogne War Museum. A wide range of activities is available to make the event unforgettable and unique: a test drive in an FV432 tank, a tour of the battlefields in vintage military vehicles such as Willys, Dodge and GMC, an orienteering race, an introduction to survival techniques, an escape game, an interactive quiz, a food walk, a beer-pairing session, walks following historical roadbooks, and more.

== Past temporary exhibitions ==
=== From Texas to Bastogne – Aggies Go to War ===
From 2014 to 2016, this temporary exhibition complemented the permanent exhibition at the Bastogne War Museum. It recounts the journey of five students from Texas A&M University during the Second World War.

=== Bulles d'Histoire ===
A series of temporary display cases showcasing unusual objects, notably from Patrick Hilgers’ collection. The Bastogne War Museum ensures that the contents of its display cases are changed regularly and that there is a thematic harmony across them. In 2024, to mark the 80th anniversary of the Liberation of Europe, the objects displayed in these cases were all linked to the Liberation.

=== Statue "The Kiss. Embracing Peace" ===
The Statue "The Kiss. Embracing Peace" in front of the Battle of the Bulge Monument

From 2016 to 2019, an eight-metre-tall statue depicted Alfred Eisenstaedt’s famous photograph. This photograph is one of the most famous from the Second World War. It shows an anonymous sailor kissing a nurse in Times Square (New York) upon the announcement of the end of the Second World War.

=== History through their eyes ===
Organised by the non-profit organisation Liberation Route Europe, this is a travelling exhibition across Europe that was shown at the Bastogne War Museum in 2018. The exhibition explores the life stories of young Europeans during the Second World War.

=== Art Liberty. From the Berlin Wall to Street Art & the "War is hell" tank ===
The ‘Art Liberty. From the Berlin Wall to Street Art’ exhibition, displayed outdoors in front of the entrance to the Bastogne War Museum from 2019 to 2024, brought together works created by street artists on original fragments of the Berlin Wall. Organised to mark the 75th anniversary of the Battle of the Bulge and the 30th anniversary of the fall of the Berlin Wall, it drew a parallel between the struggle for freedom in Europe and the memory of the Second World War.

For a short period (2019–2020), the Sherman tank ‘War is Hell’ was displayed there as a key exhibit. Transformed by the artist Jef Aérosol, it is a commemorative work paying tribute to the civilian and military victims of wars.

=== Our Common Heritage ===
“Our Common Heritage” is a temporary open-air exhibition organised as part of the European “Land of Memory” project. Through testimonies from civilians and military personnel presented in the form of illustrated albums and audiovisual materials, it traces several episodes in European history, from the period leading up to the First World War to the early days of European integration. The exhibition explores the experiences of ordinary people and the events that have helped shape the contemporary history of the European continent.

=== Bellor. Who is the man behind the "Nuts!" cartoon? ===
This exhibition was dedicated to the cartoonist Bellor, best known for his drawing associated with the phrase ‘Nuts!’, which became an emblem of American resistance during the siege of Bastogne in December 1944. It invites visitors to discover the man behind this cartoon and to place his work within the historical context of the Battle of the Bulge. A meeting with the artist’s heirs was organised during Nuts Weekend (a commemoration of the Battle of the Bulge) in December 2021.

=== Eastory through their eyes ===
This is a travelling and digital exhibition dedicated to experiences of the Second World War and its consequences in Eastern and Western Europe. It presents the stories of people who lived through the conflict and its aftermath, particularly the political changes that took place after 1945. Developed by the LRE Foundation in collaboration with several European museums, including the Bastogne War Museum, the project aims to compare national memories and foster an understanding of the different experiences of the war and the post-war period.

=== Anthropoïd ===
The ‘Anthropoid’ exhibition recounts the operation carried out on 27 May 1942 by the Czechoslovak Resistance against Reinhard Heydrich, a senior Nazi official and Reich Protector of occupied Bohemia and Moravia. Organised under the authority of the Czechoslovak government-in-exile in London, the operation resulted in Heydrich’s death and led to violent German reprisals against the civilian population, notably the destruction of the villages of Lidice and Ležáky. Presented at the Bastogne War Museum in 2022, the exhibition looks back at this major episode in European resistance to the Nazi occupation.

=== Eyewitness. Portraits of American Sacrifice ===
This exhibition presents portraits and testimonies of American veterans of the Second World War, all of whom returned to Bastogne for the commemorations of the Battle of the Ardennes. Through their personal stories and wartime experiences, the exhibition highlights the sacrifices made by an entire generation of young men. This exhibition was organised in collaboration with and with the support of the Embassy of the United States of America in Belgium.

=== B-17 / Missing in Action Project ===
The “B-17 / Missing in Action Project” exhibition features artefacts recovered in 2021 from the wreckage of the American B-17G “Bull Session” bomber, shot down by German anti-aircraft defences on 14 January 1945 over Wincrange, Luxembourg, whilst en route to Cologne. It traces the history of the aircraft and recounts the fate of its crew of nine men. Organised in collaboration with the “Battlefield Research and Preservation Group”, the exhibition combines the display of material remains with a tribute to the airmen who went missing or were killed during the mission.

=== Art of Remembrance – Contemporary Art at the Heart of Remembrance ===
This is a European travelling exhibition (which has been staged in Poland, Italy, France, the Netherlands and Belgium) dedicated to the links between contemporary artistic creation and the memory of the Second World War. It brings together works by Rebekka Bauer, Juhana Moisander, Gail Ritchie and Raphaël Dallaporta, created following artistic residencies at several European sites of remembrance. Photographs, installations, videos, natural objects and sound installations explore the tangible and intangible traces of the war, family histories and less visible forms of remembrance. Presented at the Bastogne War Museum during the summer of 2026, it forms part of a European project coordinated by Tempora and the LRE Foundation.

== Images Gallerie ==
Sherman tank

Willys MB

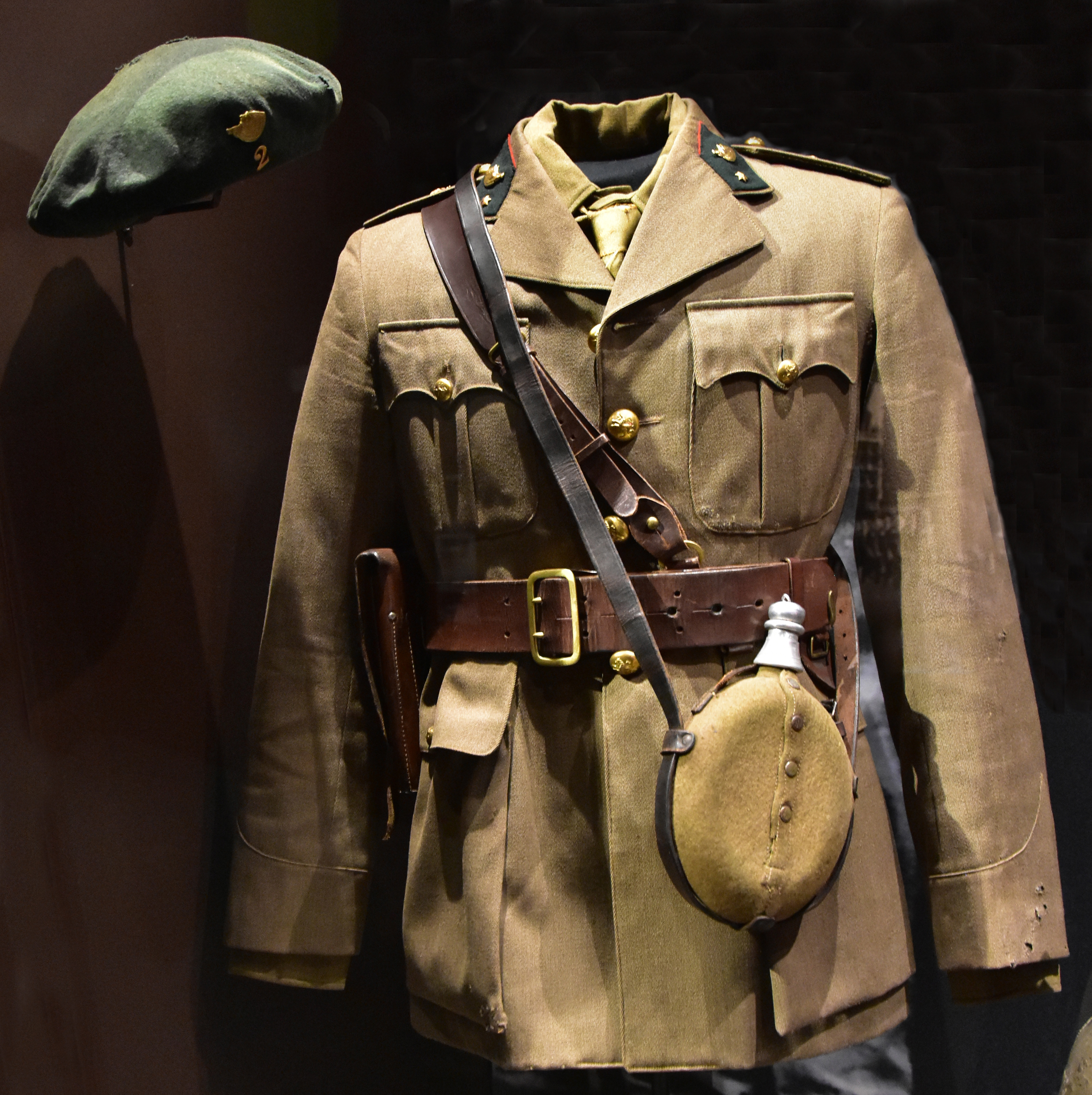
