= List of protected heritage sites in Bastogne =

This table shows an overview of the protected heritage sites in the Walloon town Bastenaken, or Bastogne. This list is part of Belgium's national heritage.

Object	Year/architect	Town/section	Address	Coordinates	Number^{?}	Image
Gate of Trier ^{(nl)} ^{(fr)}		Bastenaken	place de la Porte de Trèves	50.004950°N 5.722052°E	82003-CLT-0001-01 Info	Poort van Trier
Church of Saint-Pierre ^{(nl)} ^{(fr)}		Bastenaken	Bastogne	50.004932°N 5.721444°E	82003-CLT-0003-01 Info	Kerk Saint-Pierre More images
Ensemble of the Mardasson hill and its surroundings ^{(nl)} ^{(fr)}		Bastenaken	Bastogne	50.008874°N 5.728955°E	82003-CLT-0005-01 Info	Ensemble van de heuvel van Mardasson en zijn directe omgeving
Old choir of the Church of Bourcy (Longvilly) ^{(nl)} ^{(fr)}		Bastenaken		50.059732°N 5.807294°E	82003-CLT-0007-01 Info	
The rectory of Rachamps and the ensemble of the Presbytery, the church and surrounding grounds ^{(nl)} ^{(fr)}		Bastenaken	Bastogne	50.084289°N 5.787824°E	82003-CLT-0008-01 Info	
Washing place of Rachamps ^{(nl)} ^{(fr)}		Bastenaken	Bastogne	50.083835°N 5.787167°E	82003-CLT-0009-01 Info	Wasplaats van Rachamps
Romanesque tower and nave of three bays, followed by a polygonal apse into three parts, which goes back to the church of Saint-Lambert from 1723 ^{(nl)} ^{(fr)}		Bastenaken	Rachamps	50.083858°N 5.787878°E	82003-CLT-0010-01 Info	
Chapel of Saint-Cunibert ^{(nl)} ^{(fr)}		Bastenaken	Bizory	50.019337°N 5.765964°E	82003-CLT-0011-01 Info	Kapel van Saint-Cunibert
Harzy Chapel (now Chapel of the Holy Guardian Angels (Saints-Anges caretakers')) and the churchyard wall that surrounds it, and the ensemble of the chapel and surrounding cemetery wall ^{(nl)} ^{(fr)}		Bastenaken	Bastogne	49.993881°N 5.795047°E	82003-CLT-0012-01 Info	Kapel van Harzy (nu Kapel van de Heilige Engelbewaarders('Saints-Anges Gardiens')) en de kerkhofmuur die het omringt, en het ensemble van de kapel en de omliggende kerkhofmuur
Chapel of Saint-Laurent ^{(nl)} ^{(fr)}		Bastenaken	Bastogne	50.008768°N 5.717235°E	82003-CLT-0013-01 Info	Kapel Saint-Laurent
The facades and roofs of the farmhouse Didier Lamborelle ^{(nl)} ^{(fr)}		Bastenaken	Benonchamps n°18, Bastogne	50.003836°N 5.809712°E	82003-CLT-0015-01 Info	De gevels en daken van de boerderij Didier of Lamborelle
The facades and roofs of the main building of the farm, and the ensemble e vand farm, chapel and surrounding grounds ^{(nl)} ^{(fr)}		Bastenaken	Grand-Route n°6, Bizory	50.018992°N 5.765269°E	82003-CLT-0016-01 Info	
The facades and roofs of the chapel Notre-Dame de Bonne conduite, and the ensemble of the building and the environment ^{(nl)} ^{(fr)}		Bastenaken		49.990110°N 5.722432°E	82003-CLT-0017-01 Info	De gevels en daken van de kapel Notre-Dame de Bonne Conduite, en het ensemble van het gebouw en de omgeving
The totality of the chapel Notre-Dame de la Paix ^{(nl)} ^{(fr)}		Bastenaken	Bastogne	50.002961°N 5.718019°E	82003-CLT-0018-01 Info	
Gate of Trier ^{(nl)} ^{(fr)}		Bastenaken		50.004950°N 5.722052°E	82003-PEX-0001-01 Info	Poort van Trier
Church of Saint-Pierre ^{(nl)} ^{(fr)}		Bastenaken		50.004932°N 5.721444°E	82003-PEX-0002-01 Info	Kerk Saint-Pierre

== See also ==
- List of protected heritage sites in Luxembourg (Belgium)
- Bastogne
