= Guy Lutgen =

Belgian politician (1936–2020)

Guy Lutgen (19 April 1936 – 26 July 2020) was a Belgian politician and member of Christian Social Party.

Lutgen was born in Noville, Bastogne on 19 April 1936. He studied classic philology at the Catholic University of Leuven and taught history and Latin at the seminary in Bastogne until 1977.

Lutgen began his political career in 1964, winning a seat on the Bastogne communal council, which he retained until 2000. He was also mayor of Bastogne from 1976 to 2000. Between 1977 and 1995, Lutgen was a member of the Senate, representing an electoral district encompassing Arlon, Marche-en-Famenne, and Bastogne. His tenure within the Parliament of Wallonia began in 1980 and ended in 1995. From 1985 to 1988, Lutgen was secretary of state for modernization of public services. He subsequently served the Government of Wallonia as a minister. He led the agriculture and environmental ministry from May 1988 to July 1999, and was concurrently minister of energy, until January 1989. Lutgen retained the position of Minister of Agriculture throughout, but took on duties at the housing ministry until January 1992, after which he assumed responsibility for natural resources until July 1999.

His son Benoît Lutgen is also a politician. Lutgen's other children are Françoise and Jean-Pierre. His daughter Christine died in 2009.

Guy Lutgen died on 26 July 2020, at the age of 84.
