= Battle of the Bulge Monument =

American war memorial near Bastogne, France

Coordinates: 50°0′35″N 5°44′20″E

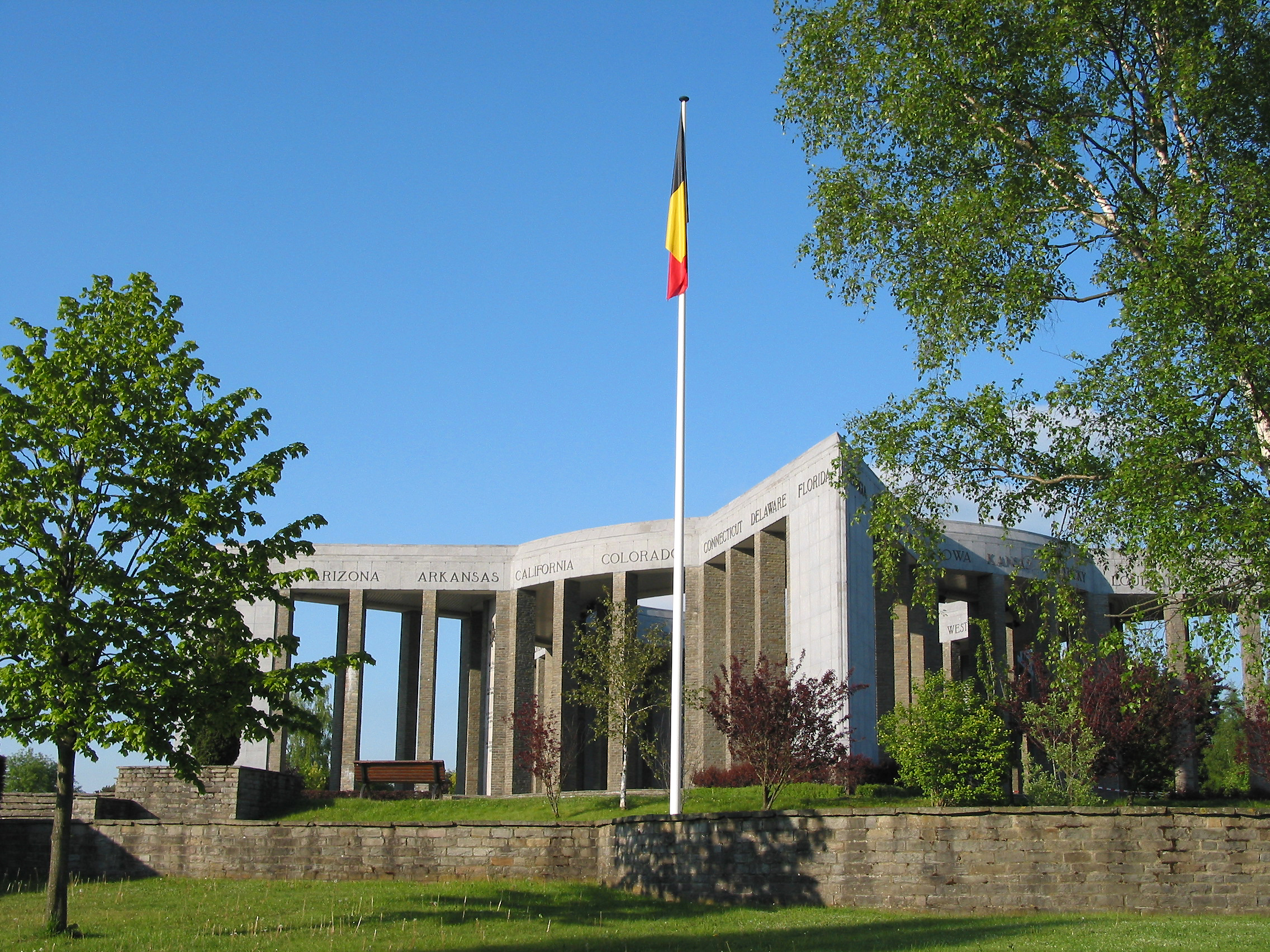
The Mardasson Memorial

The Battle of the Bulge Monument, formerly known as the Mardasson Memorial (French: Mémorial du Mardasson), is a monument honoring the memory of American soldiers wounded or killed during World War II's Battle of the Bulge. Designed in the shape of a five-pointed American star, it is located near Bastogne in the Luxembourg province of Belgium. The first step toward the memorial was undertaken on July 4, 1946, with the presentation of some earth from the site to U.S. President Harry Truman. The dedication was on July 16, 1950.

== Design ==
Belgian architect Georges Dedoyard designed a 12 metres (39 ft) tall monument in the shape of a five-pointed American star with 31 metres (102 ft) sides surrounding a 20 metres (66 ft) wide atrium. The inner walls are covered with ten passages carved in stone commemorating the battle, and the parapet bears the names of the 48 U.S. States. Insignia of most participating battalions are shown on the walls, representing the 76,890 killed and wounded during the thwarted December 1944–January 1945 German Watch on the Rhine offensive, known in English by the colloquial "Battle of the Bulge".

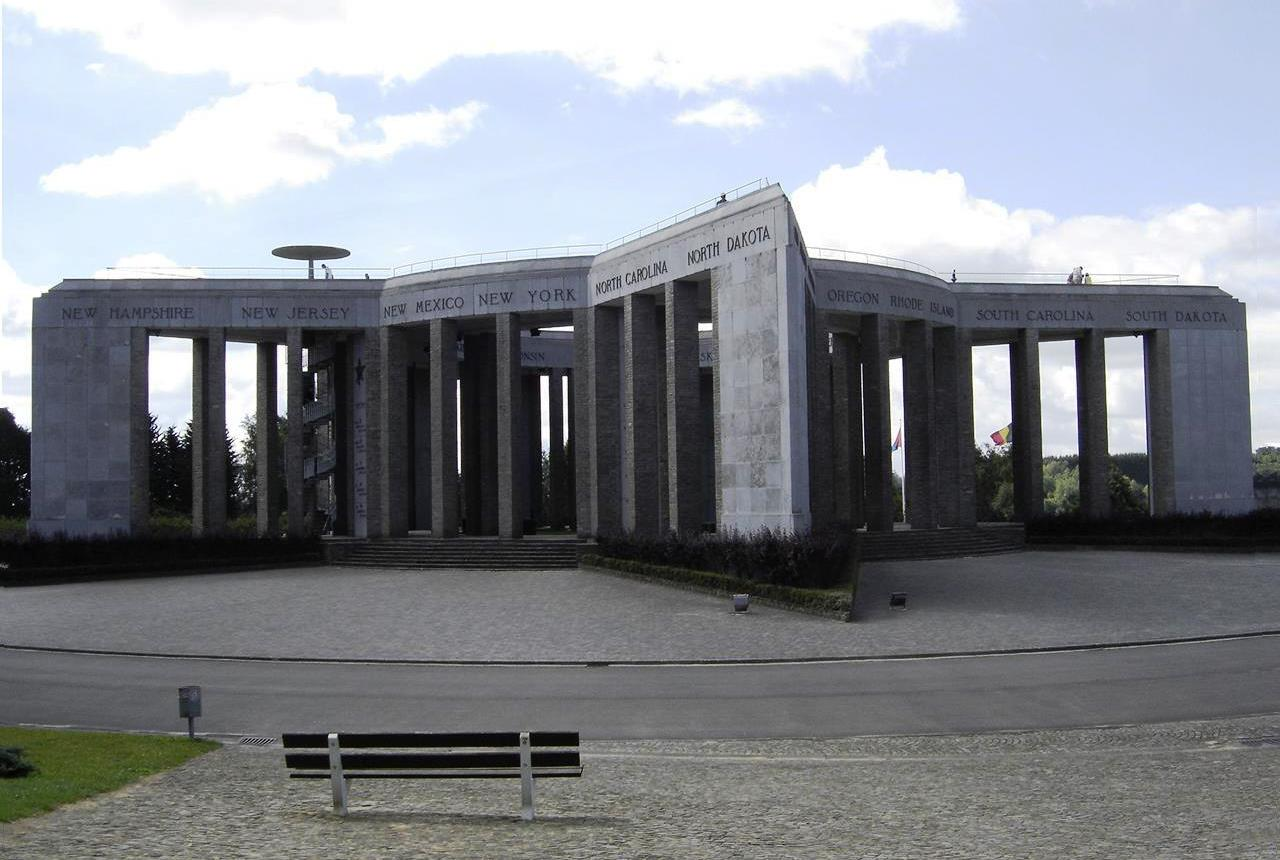
Battle of the Bulge Monument from the north

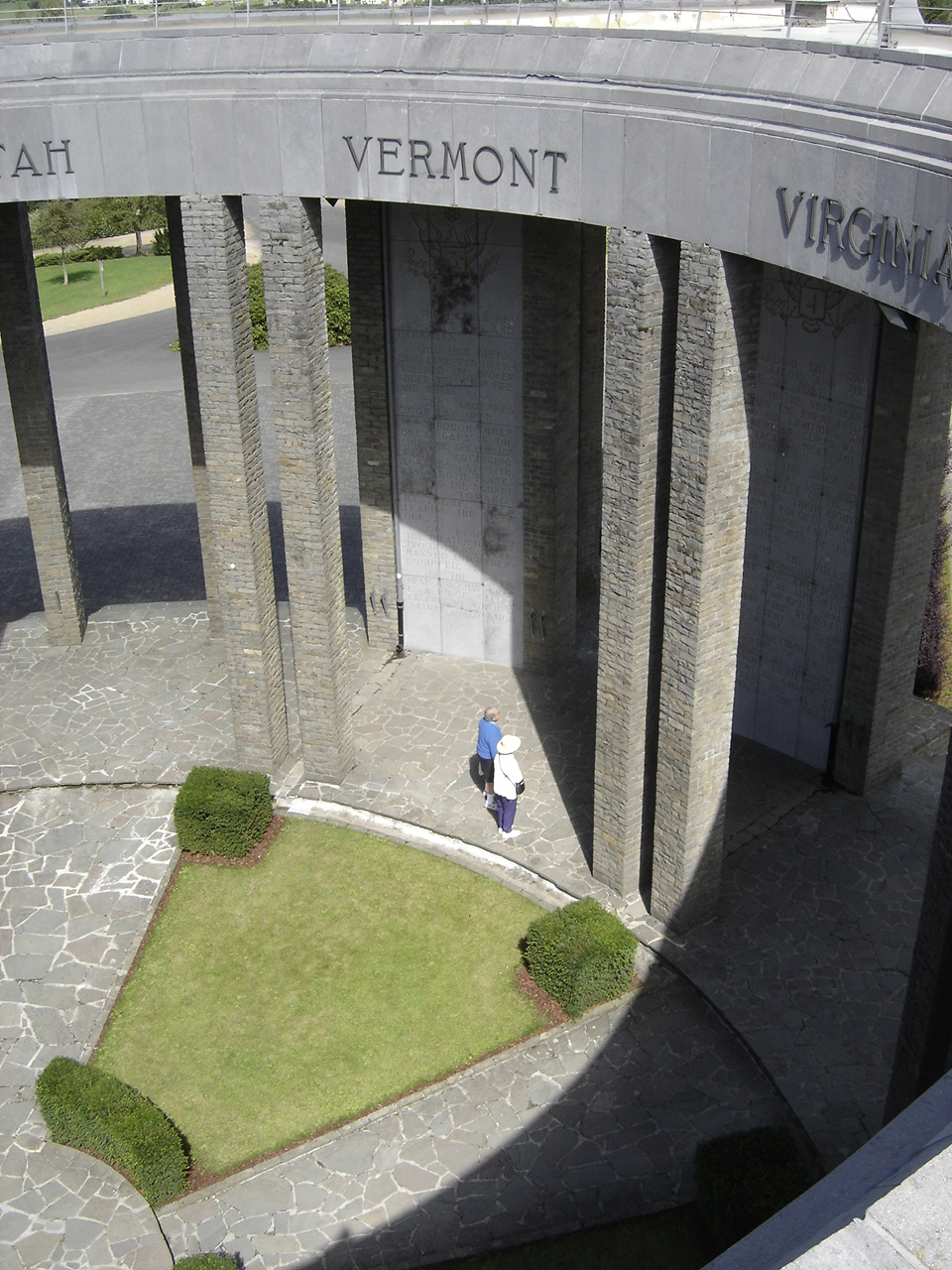
The names of the then 48 U.S. States encircle the Memorial's parapet, honoring U.S. casualties in the Battle of the Bulge

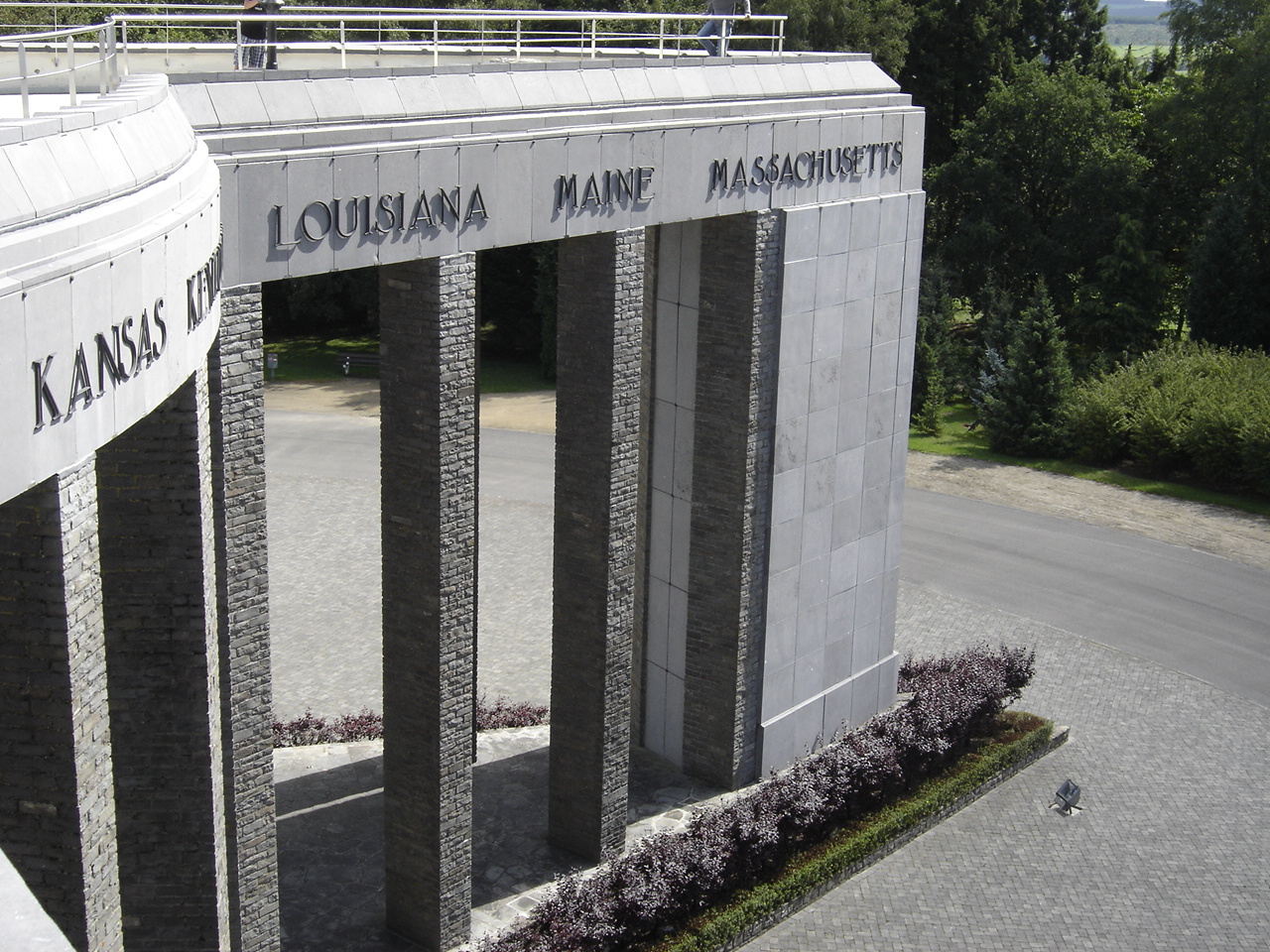
The southeast wing of the five-pointed U.S. star-shaped structure

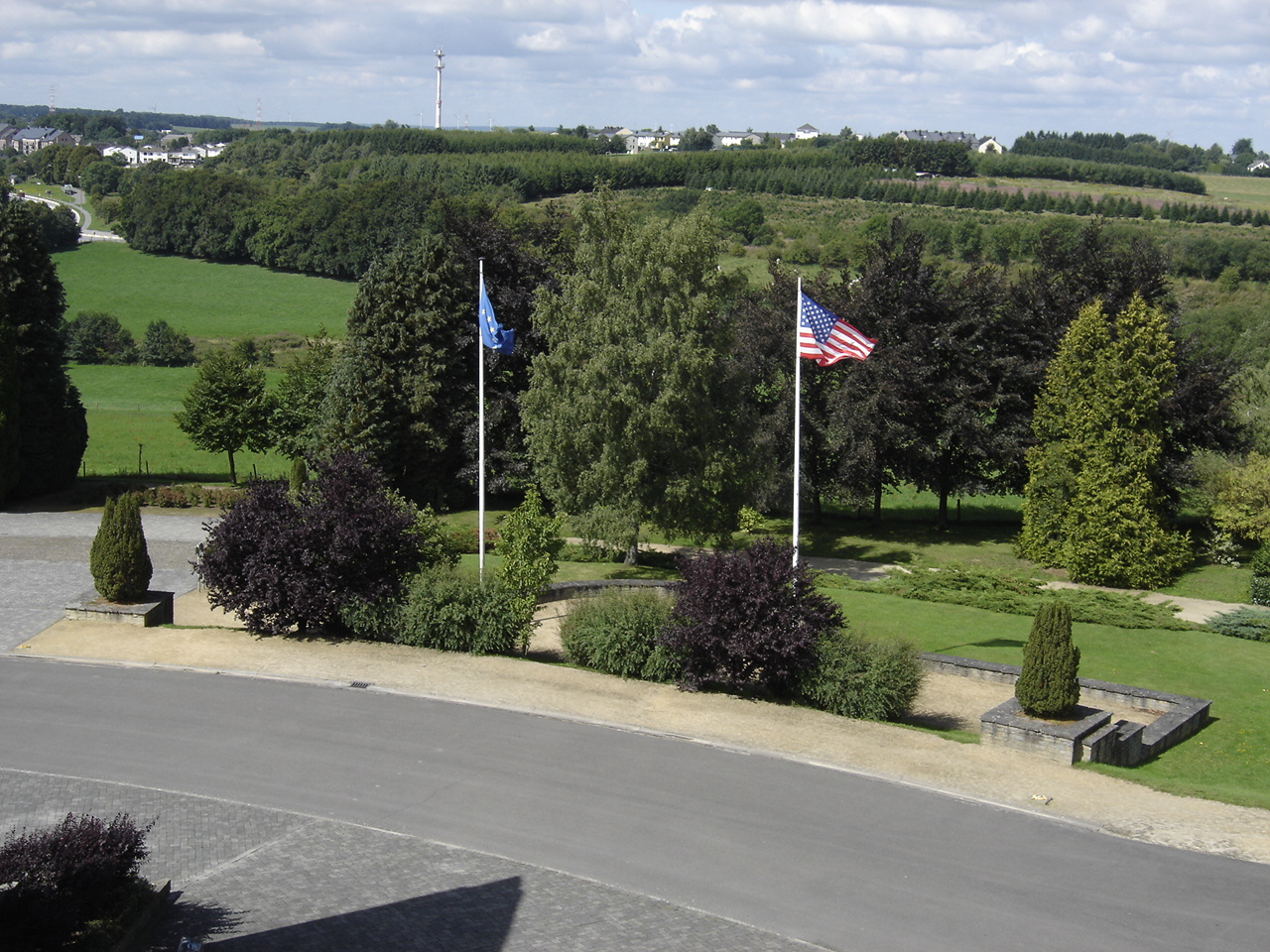
The rolling Bastogne countryside seen from atop the Memorial

Below the structure a crypt with three altars – one each for Protestant, Catholic and Jewish services – was carved, and decorated with mosaics by French artist Fernand Léger.

== Memorial Stone ==
The Latin inscription on the memorial stone:

LIBERATORIBVS
AMERICANIS
POPVLVS BELGICVS
MEMOR
IV.VII.MCMXLVI.

translates to "The Belgian people remember their American liberators – 4th July 1946."

== Story of the Battle ==
The ten carved panels ringing the inside of the memorial tell the story of the battle. Their text reads:

1. THIS MEMORIAL AND THE EARTH SURROUNDING ARE DEDICATED TO THE ENDURING FRIENDSHIP OF THE PEOPLES OF BELGIUM AND THE UNITED STATES WHO FORGED A BOND FROM THEIR COMMON STRUGGLE TO DEFEAT THE ENEMY OF ALL FREE PEOPLES.

FOR THE ARMIES OF THE UNITED STATES IN NUMBERS OF MEN ENGAGED, IN THE COURAGE SHOWN BY ALL FORCES, IN THE INTREPID DECISION OF THEIR LEADERS, AND IN FINAL ACCOMPLISHMENT, IT WAS ONE OF THE GREAT BATTLES OF THEIR HISTORY. FOR THE PEOPLE OF BELGIUM, IT WAS THE FINAL STAND AGAINST AN ENEMY WHO FOR NEARLY FIVE YEARS HAD VIOLATED THEIR SOIL AND VAINLY TRIED TO CRUSH THEIR

2. . . . NATIONAL SPIRIT. IT WAS THE LAST ACT OF THE GREAT LIBERATION. THE UNIFORMED RANKS OF THE UNITED STATES FOUGHT FOR THIS SOIL AS IF IT HAD BEEN THEIR HOMELAND. THE BELGIAN CIVILIANS, UNARMED, REFUSED TO ABANDON IT IN FACE OF THE ONCOMING ENEMY. THE BATTLE OF THE BULGE OPENED ON DECEMBER 16, 1944 WITH AN ATTACK BY THE GERMAN ENEMY WHICH BROKE THE AMERICAN FRONT, ENVELOPED THE ARDENNES COUNTRY AND AT ITS EXTREMITIES, REACHED ALMOST TO THE RIVER MEUSE, IT CLOSED IN THE FINAL WEEK OF JANUARY 1945. THE FAR OBJECT OF THE GERMAN ENEMY WAS TO BE THE PORT OF ANTWERP.

3. THE BATTLE BEGAN WITH FOG AND DARKNESS. THE THIN DEFENDING LINE WAS OVERWHELMED AND BROKEN UNDER WEIGHT OF FIRE AND METAL. THE ARDENNES DOOR LAY OPEN. THROUGH THESE GREAT GAPS IN THE LINE THE SPEARHEADS WERE ADVANCING TOWARDS ST. VITH FROM BOTH FLANKS AROUND THE SCHNEE EIFEL TOWARDS BASTOGNE, AFTER LEAPING THE RIVER OUR. OF RESERVES, THE THEATER HAD BUT TWO DIVISIONS, UNDERMANNED AND UNDEREQUIPPED. IN THE NORTH NEAR MANSCHAU THERE IS A RIDGE CALLED ELSENBORN WHICH IS NATURE’S BASTION . . .

4. . . . GUARDING THE ROAD TO LIEGE AND THE FAR-OFF PORT. IN THE VERY HOUR WHEN THE ENEMY LOOSENED HIS LIGHTNING, AN AMERICAN CORPS WAS ATTACKING THIS GROUND. AS THE SHOCK OF THE ENEMY GUNS AND ARMOR FELL ON THESE DIVISIONS THEIR RIGHT FLANK FOLDED BACK AND STOOD FAST ON THE HEIGHTS OF ELSENBORN. ON THE HILLS NEAR MONSCHAU, THE LINE OF AMERICAN GUNS BEAT TIME WITH THIS MOVEMENT, AND THEIR FIRE WITHERED THE ENEMY CORPS ON THE RIGHT. TOGETHER THE WORKING OF THESE FORCES AT THE BEGINNING DENIED THE ENEMY HIS CHANCE TO EXPAND HIS SALIENT TOWARDS THE GREAT

5. . . . CITIES AND THE SEA. FROM OUT OF THE NORTH AMERICAS ARMOR RODE TO ST. VITH AT FIRST A COMBAT TEAM AND THEN A DIVISION. FROM OUT OF THE SOUTH A GARRISON RODE FOR BASTOGNE. IT COUNTED ONE AIRBORNE DIVISION AND A TEAM OF ARMOR ON THE GROUND. IT WOULD LINK WITH A BATTALION OF TANK DESTROYERS SENT FROM THE NORTH. RIGHT UNDER THE GUNS THE ODDMENTS JOINED THE FIGHTING, REPAIRMEN, CLERKS, POLICE, AND DRIVERS OF TRUCKS. THEY PICKED UP ARMS AND MOVED TO A THREATENED CROSSROADS OR BLEW A BRIDGE OR GUARDED THE PRECIOUS STORES. IN BRITAIN THE NEWLY ARRIVED FORMATIONS . . .

6. . . . WERE ALERTED TO GO BY AIR TO DEFEND THE LINE OF THE MEUSE. THE BASE OF SUPPLY IN FRANCE REORGANIZED TO FEED THE BATTLE. ITS CONVOYS GOING ELSEWHERE WERE HALTED AND FACED ABOUT. AT ST. VITH THE ENEMY ALREADY SWARMED OVER THE COUNTRY BUT THE RESCUING ARMOR ARRIVED IN TIME TO BLOCK THE ROAD, BLUNT THE BLOW, AND CRIPPLE THE ENEMY POWER DURING THE CRISIS HOURS. THE SPEARHEAD OF THE PANZER ARMY IN THE NORTH ROLLED OFF THE FLANK OF THIS DEFENSE AND ON PAST STAVELOT. THEN, IN THE DEFILES BEYOND THE RIVER AMBLEVE, IT WAS TRAPPED AND HELD BY THE . . .

7. . . .NEW FORCES OF THE COUNTER ATTACK. THE FIGHTING WAS WITHIN TWENTY MILES OF LIEGE. THE RACE TO BASTOGNE WAS WON BY THE AMERICAN COLUMN. IT CLOSED IN JUST IN TIME. THE FIGHTING BEGAN BEFORE DEFENDERS COULD TAKE POSITION. THEY ORGANIZED UNDER FIRE FROM ENEMY GUNS. IN THIS WAY BEGAN THE SIEGE NOW FAMED IN HISTORY. THE LINES OF BASTOGNE HELD FIRM, THOUGH THE STORM BEAT ALL AROUND. BY DIRECT ASSAULT THE ENEMY ARMORED CORPS TRIED TO GAIN THE CITY. ITS MEN AND METAL WERE DRIVEN BACK AT EVERY POINT. AND SO THE DEFEATED ARMOR FLOWED ON AROUND BASTOGNE . . .

8. . . . STILL SEEKING TO GAIN THE LINE OF THE RIVER MEUSE. ITS SPEARPOINT REACHED ALMOST TO THE DOOR OF DINANT BEFORE IT WAS STOPPED BY THE FIRE OF THE NEW AMERICAN LINE. THE DEFEAT OF THIS SOUTHERN PANZER ARMY WAS MADE SURE BY THE STAND OF BASTOGNE. TO THE SOUTH OF THE BULGE, AN AMERICAN ARMY HAD BEEN ATTACKING EASTWARD. IT WAS CALLED NOW TO HALT AND WHEEL TO THE NORTH. ITS NEAREST CORPS MOVED OUT UPON THIS MISSION. FROM OUT OF THE CORPS, ONE DIVISION STRUCK TOWARDS BASTOGNE. THE WEATHER AT LAST TURNED COLD. THE LOSS FROM . . .

9. . . . EXPOSURE GREW GREAT AS THE LOSS FROM FIRE. ATTACKING IN SNOWSUITS, THE ENEMY COULD SCARCELY BE SEEN. BASTOGNE BECAME THE CHIEF PRIZE IN THE DAILY STRUGGLE, AS MEN FOUGHT FOR SHELTER AND FOR WARMTH. THE FOLK OF THE ARDENNES OPENED THEIR HEARTS AND HEARTHS TO THE DEFENDERS. THEY SHARED WITH THEM THEIR FOOD, THEIR BLANKETS, AND THEIR FUEL. THEY TORE UP THEIR BEDSHEETS FOR USE IN CONCEALING MEN AND WEAPONS. THEY NURSED THE WOUNDED AND HELPED TO COMFORT THE ILL. BY CHRISTMAS EVE, THE ENEMY KNEW THAT HIS PLAN WAS DEFEATED. BUT THERE WAS NO SUDDEN STRATEGIC RETREAT. EVERY HILL . . .

10. . . . AND ROADWAY HAD TO BE RE-WON BY FIREPOWER AND BY PAYING A PRICE IN THE LIVES OF VALIANT MEN. IN THE BATTLE FOUGHT HERE, 76,890 AMERICANS WERE KILLED OR WOUNDED, OR WERE MARKED MISSING. SELDOM HAS MORE AMERICAN BLOOD BEEN SPILLED IN THE COURSE OF A SINGLE BATTLE. THE NUMBER OF BELGIANS WHO DIED OR SUFFERED WOUNDS OR GREAT PRIVATION HELPING THESE FRIENDS FROM OVERSEAS IN THE COMMON DEFENCE CANNOT BE KNOWN . . . OF THESE DEAD AND OF ALL WHO FOUGHT HERE, THE NOW LIVING MAY ATTEST THE GREATNESS OF THE DEED ONLY BY INCREASED DEVOTION TO THE FREEDOM FOR WHICH THEY BRAVED THE FIRE.

== Bastogne War Museum ==
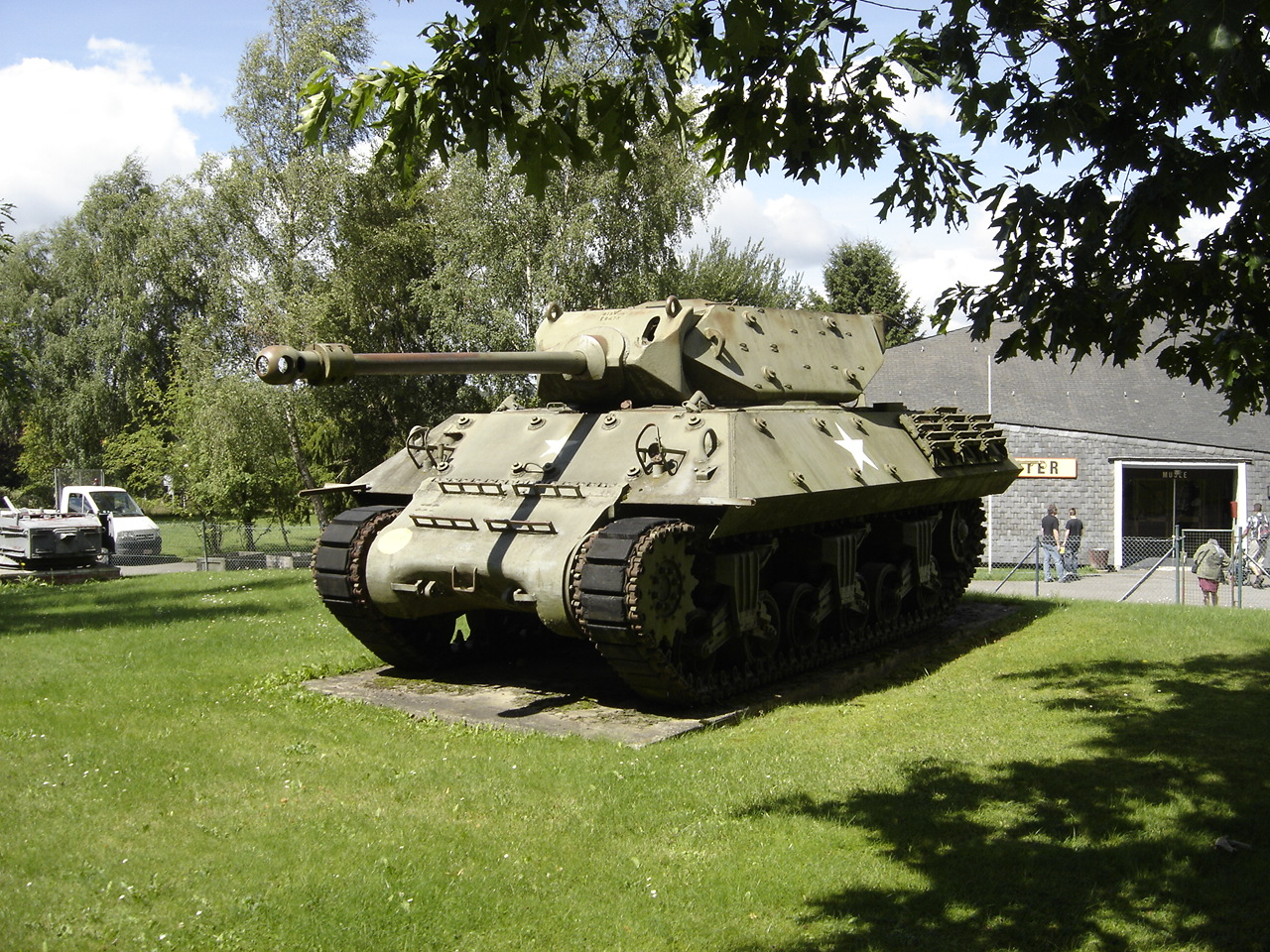
M10 Achilles self-propelled anti-tank gun displayed outside the nearby Bastogne War Museum

Just beyond the memorial in easy walking distance is the Bastogne War Museum, which displays World War II artifacts and shows a film containing footage shot during the battle.

== See also ==
- Henri-Chapelle American Cemetery and Memorial
- Ardennes American Cemetery and Memorial
