= List of protected heritage sites in Libramont-Chevigny =

This table shows an overview of the protected heritage sites in the Walloon town Libramont-Chevigny. This list is part of Belgium's national heritage.

Object	Year/architect	Town/section	Address	Coordinates	Number^{?}	Image
Rural Buildings, currently a farm ^{(nl)} ^{(fr)}		Libramont-Chevigny	Remagne, Rue du Centre n° 6	49.976462°N 5.493443°E	84077-CLT-0001-01 Info	
Church of Saint-Pierre and ensemble of the church, the cemetery and its walls ^{(nl)} ^{(fr)}		Libramont-Chevigny		49.903668°N 5.388001°E	84077-CLT-0002-01 Info	Kerk Saint-Pierre en ensemble van de genoemde kerk, het kerkhof met zijn ommuring More images
Ponds of Luchy ^{(nl)} ^{(fr)}		Libramont-Chevigny		49.891428°N 5.314607°E	84077-CLT-0003-01 Info	

== See also ==
- List of protected heritage sites in Luxembourg (Belgium)
