= Recogne =

Coordinates: 50°03′05″N 5°44′10″E

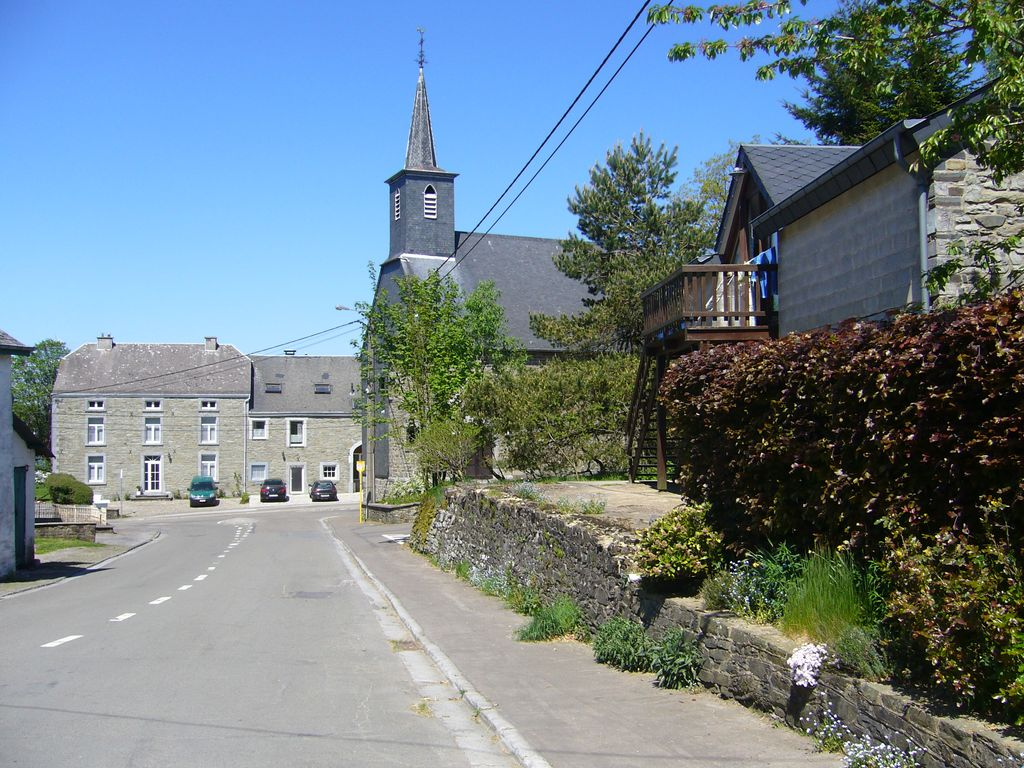

Recogne (Walloon: R(i)cogne) is a village of Wallonia and a district of the municipality of Libramont-Chevigny, located in the Ardennes in the province of Luxembourg, Belgium.

Recogne is located a few miles north of Bastogne, in an area that saw heavy fighting during the Battle of the Bulge. Since 1947 it has been the location of Recogne German war cemetery. This cemetery was walled off and a chapel was built in 1954.

Minor planet 3365 Recogne is named for the village.
