= Recogne German war cemetery =

Cemetery near Bastogne, Belgium

Coordinates: 50°02′54″N 5°44′27″E

Recogne (Bastogne) German war cemetery
- German War Graves Commission; Volksbund Deutsche Kriegsgräberfürsorge.
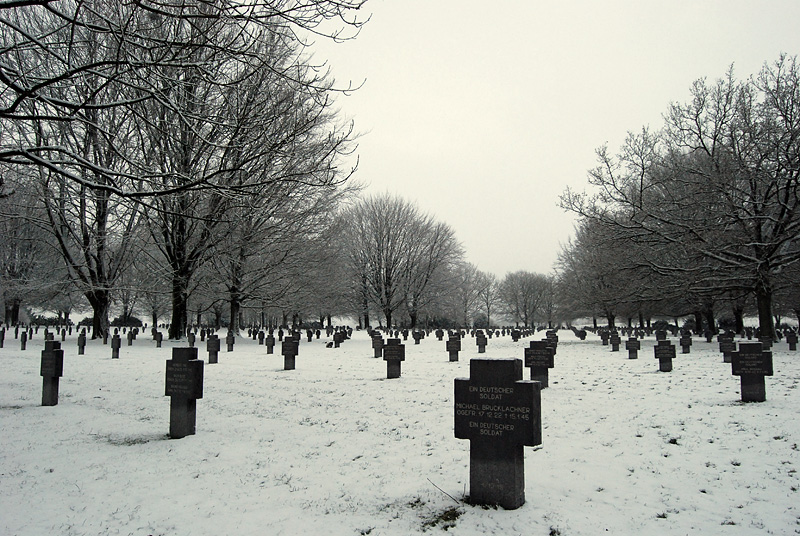
- Deutscher Soldatenfriedhof Bastogne-Recogne
- Used for those deceased
- Established: 1945
- Location: near Bastogne
- Total burials: 6,807

Burials by nation
- Nazi Germany

Burials by war
- World War II

Recogne German war cemetery is located in the hamlet of Recogne near the municipality of Bastogne, Belgium. It contains the graves of 6,807 German soldiers of the Second World War. The cemetery is situated to the east of the hamlet, and to the south of the road to Foy. It is maintained by the German War Graves Commission.

== History ==
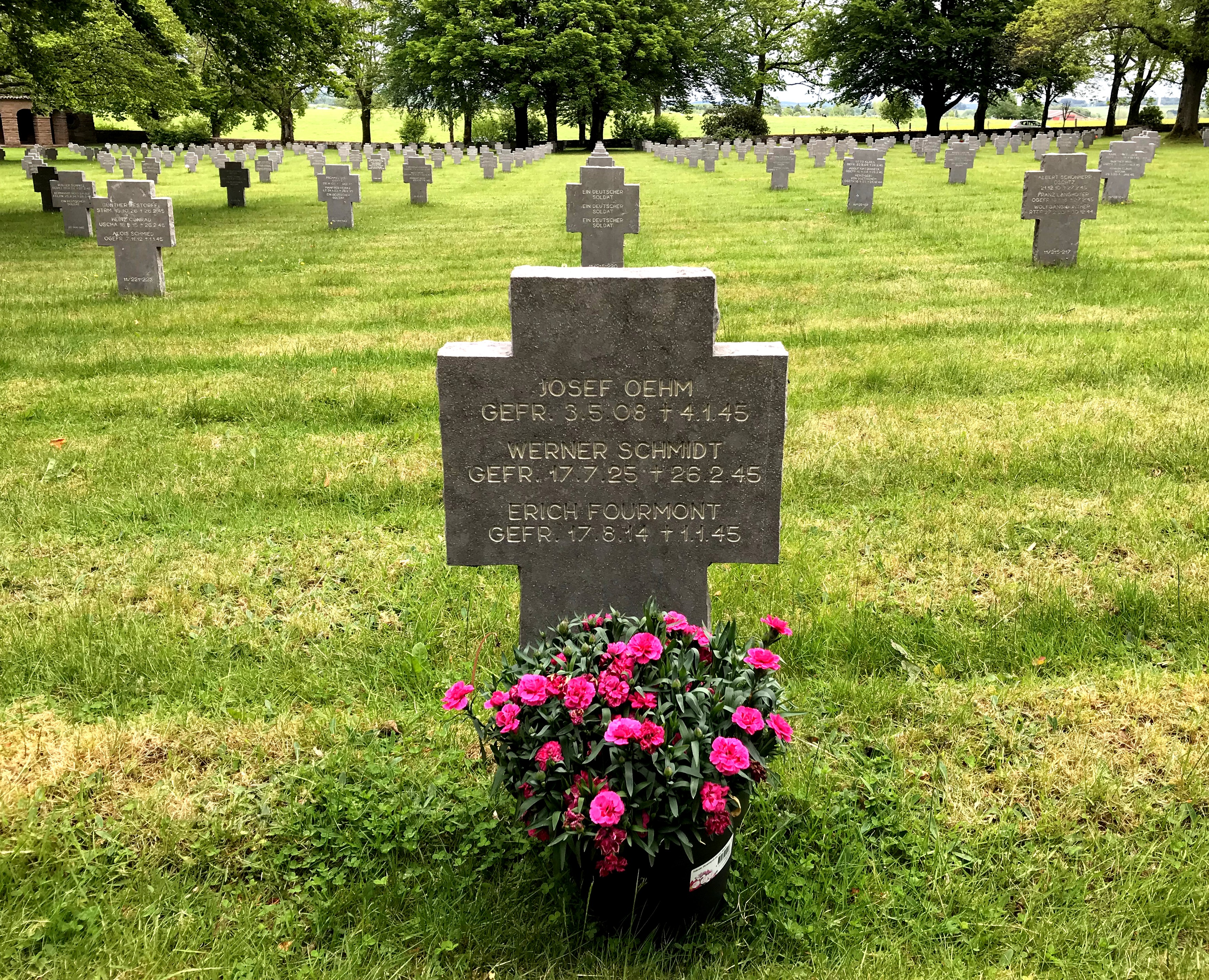
Graves in the cemetery

In the last winter of the Second World War, the Germans launched the Ardennes Offensive. They surrounded Bastogne but were unable to take the city. After heavy fighting, the Americans reconquered the area in January 1945. In February 1945, they established a cemetery in Recogne, where some 2,700 Americans and 3,000 Germans were buried. After the war, in 1945–1946, the remains of the fallen American soldiers were transferred to Henri-Chapelle American Cemetery and Memorial. In the meantime, the Belgian authorities started clearing all German cemeteries in the area, and transferred all German graves either to Recogne or to Lommel German war cemetery. Therefore, the cemetery also contains graves of Germans killed in 1940 or during the occupation. In the 1950s the cemetery was transferred to the German War Graves Commission.

== Sources ==
- (de) Internetsite Volksbund Deutsche Kriegsgräberfürsorge)
- (de) Deutscher Soldatenfriedhof Recogne-Bastogne
