= Noville, Bastogne =

Noville
- District and village
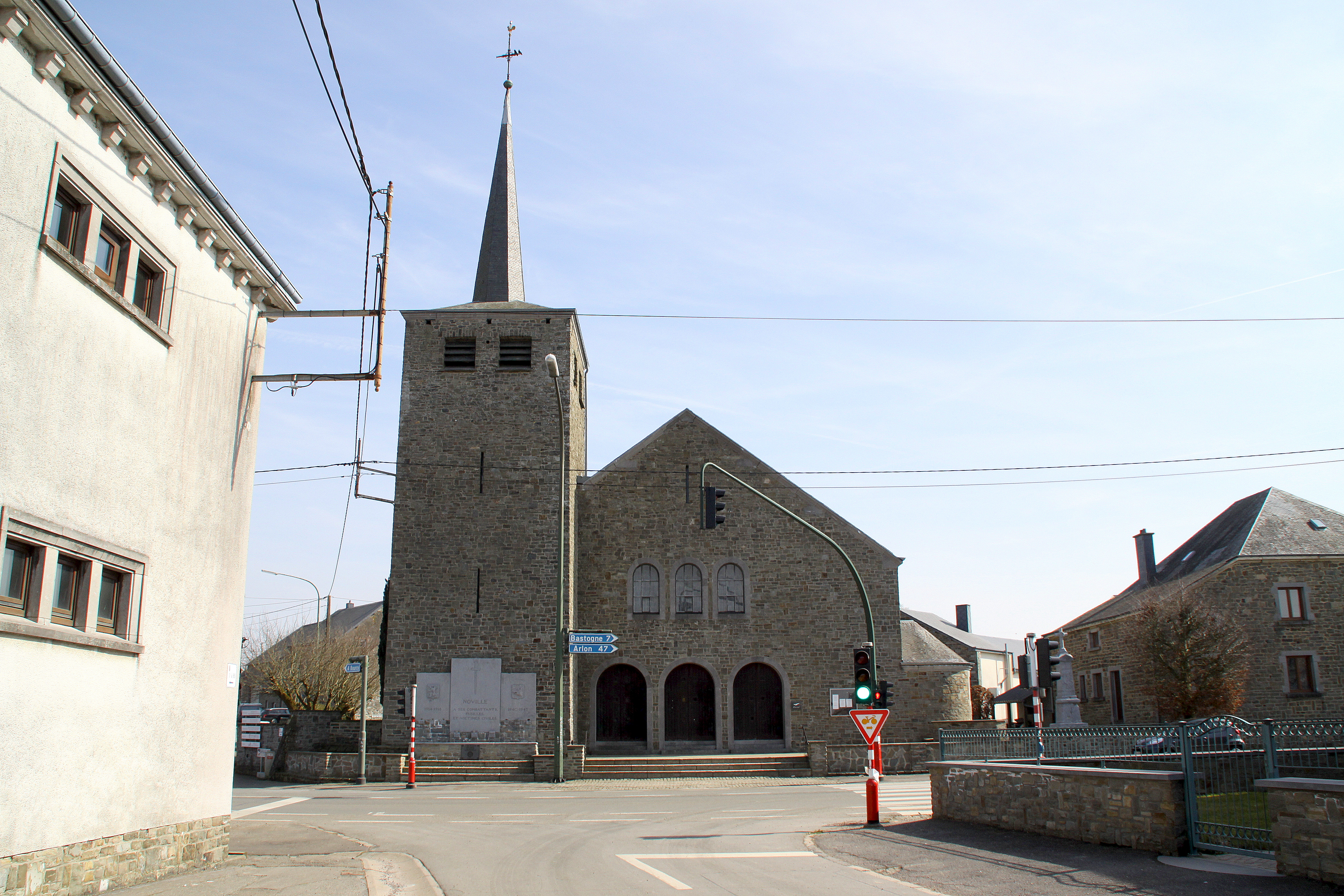
- Saint-Étienne Church, March 2015

- Location in Belgium
- Coordinates: 50°03′50″N 05°45′40″E
- Country: Belgium
- Region: Wallonia
- Province: Luxembourg
- Municipality: Bastogne

Population (1 January 2024)
  - Total: 2,274
- Postal codes: 6600

Noville is a village and district of the municipality of Bastogne, located in the province of Luxembourg of the Wallonia region of Belgium. N30 road passes through Noville.

== World War II ==
=== Battle of the Bulge ===
On 18 December 1944, Colonel William L. Roberts, commanding the 10th Armored Division Combat Command B would enter Bastonge and then be instructed to split the armor into three teams that would be allocated to the villages of Noville, Longvilly, and Wardin. The battalion-sized Task Force assigned to Noville would be commanded by William R. Desobry and be known as "Team Desobry". All three teams would help delay the German advance and allow the 101st Airborne Division to establish defenses on the outskirts of Bastogne.

Noville would be sieged by the German 2nd Panzer Division, consisting of probing and artillery, however Team Desobry was able to fend off the numerically superior threat. The conditions had been favorable for Team Desobry as the fog lifted and the cold hampered German tank movement. During said siege, Team Desobry would be reinforced by 1st Battalion, 506th Parachute Infantry Regiment. By 20 December, Team Desobry withdrew from Noville, allowing the German forces to begin the Siege of Bastogne, itself part of the Battle of the Bulge.

On 21 December 1944, 8 people were massacred by the SS, including a teacher, a parish priest, the father of Guy Lutgen, and the uncle and father of Gérard Deprez. A memorial was erected in remembrance of the massacre, as well as one to Team Desobry.
