= Denis Ducarme =

Belgian politician (born 1973)

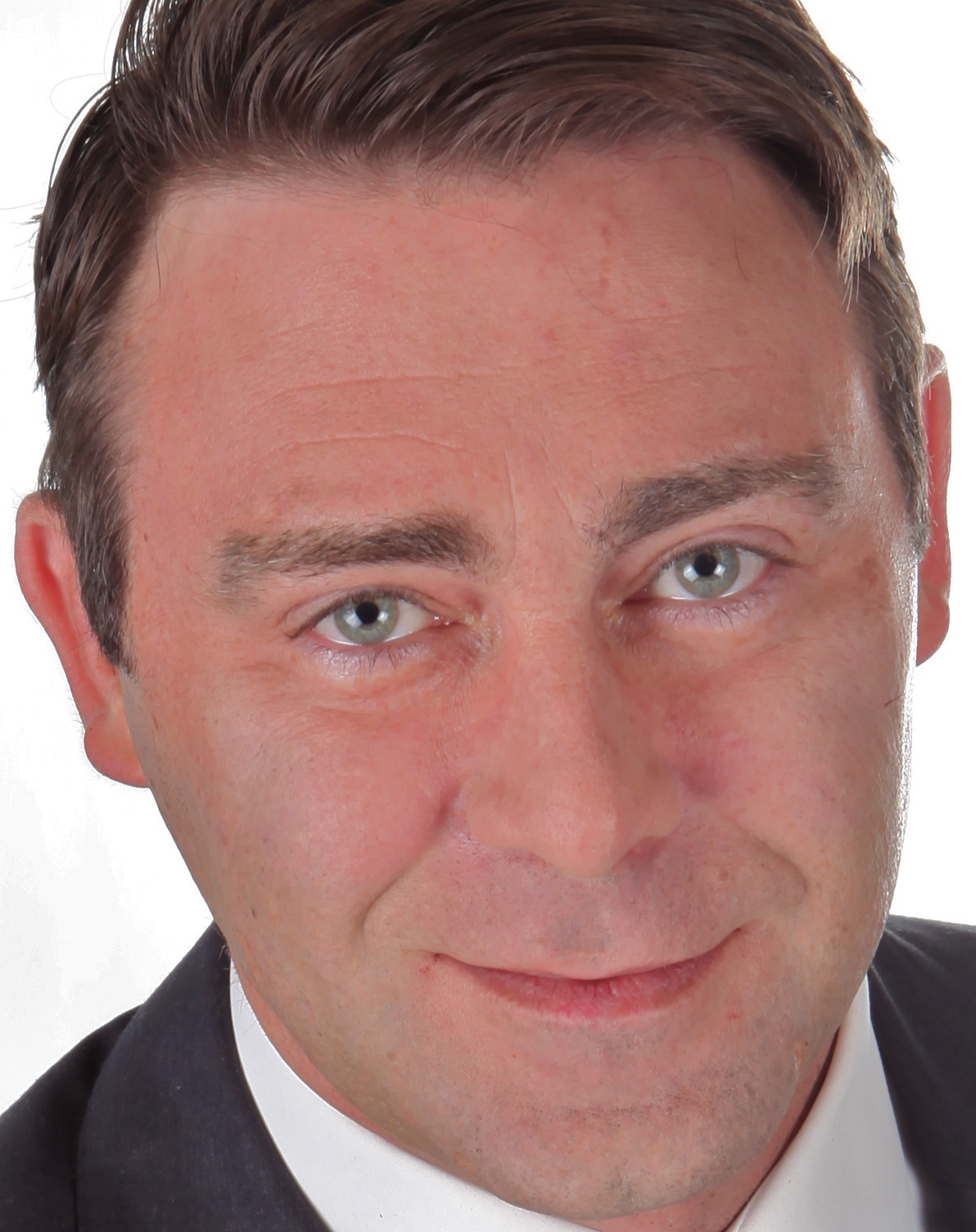

Minister of the Middle Class, SMEs, Self-employed, Agriculture, Social Integration and Urban Policy
- In office 28 July 2017 – 1 October 2020
- Monarch: Philippe
- Prime Minister: Charles Michel; Sophie Wilmès
- Preceded by: Willy Borsus
- Succeeded by: David Clarinval

Member of Chamber of Representatives
- Incumbent
- Assumed office June 5, 2003

Personal details
- Born: October 23, 1973 (age 52) Watermael-Boitsfort, Belgium
- Party: Reformist Movement
- Education: Université libre de Bruxelles

Denis Ducarme (French: [dəni dykaʁm]; born 23 October 1973 in Watermael-Boitsfort) is a Belgian Walloon politician. As a member of the Reformist Movement, he served as the Federal Minister of the Middle Class, SMEs, Self-employed, Agriculture, Social Integration and Urban Policy in the Michel Government and Wilmès Government from 2017 to 2020 and a member of parliament since 2003.

== Biography ==
Ducarme is the son of Daniel Ducarme, former Minister-President of Brussels and founding member and first president of the Reformist Movement. Ducarme obtained a master's degree in political sciences, international relations and European integration at the Université libre de Bruxelles.

== Political career ==
After the 2000 local elections, Ducarme became the Alderman charged with public works, economic affairs, employment and sport of Thuin. He subsequently also became a Provincial Councillor of Hainaut. In 2003, he became a Member of the Chamber of Representatives for Hainaut. In October 2014, he became the leader of the liberal faction in the Chamber. On 28 July 2017, he became the new minister for Middle Class, SMEs, Self-employed, Agriculture, Social Integration charged with the policy on railway systems and the regulation of railway and air traffic.
