= Libramont-Chevigny =

Municipality in Wallonia, Belgium

Libramont-Chevigny Libråmont (Walloon)
- Municipality
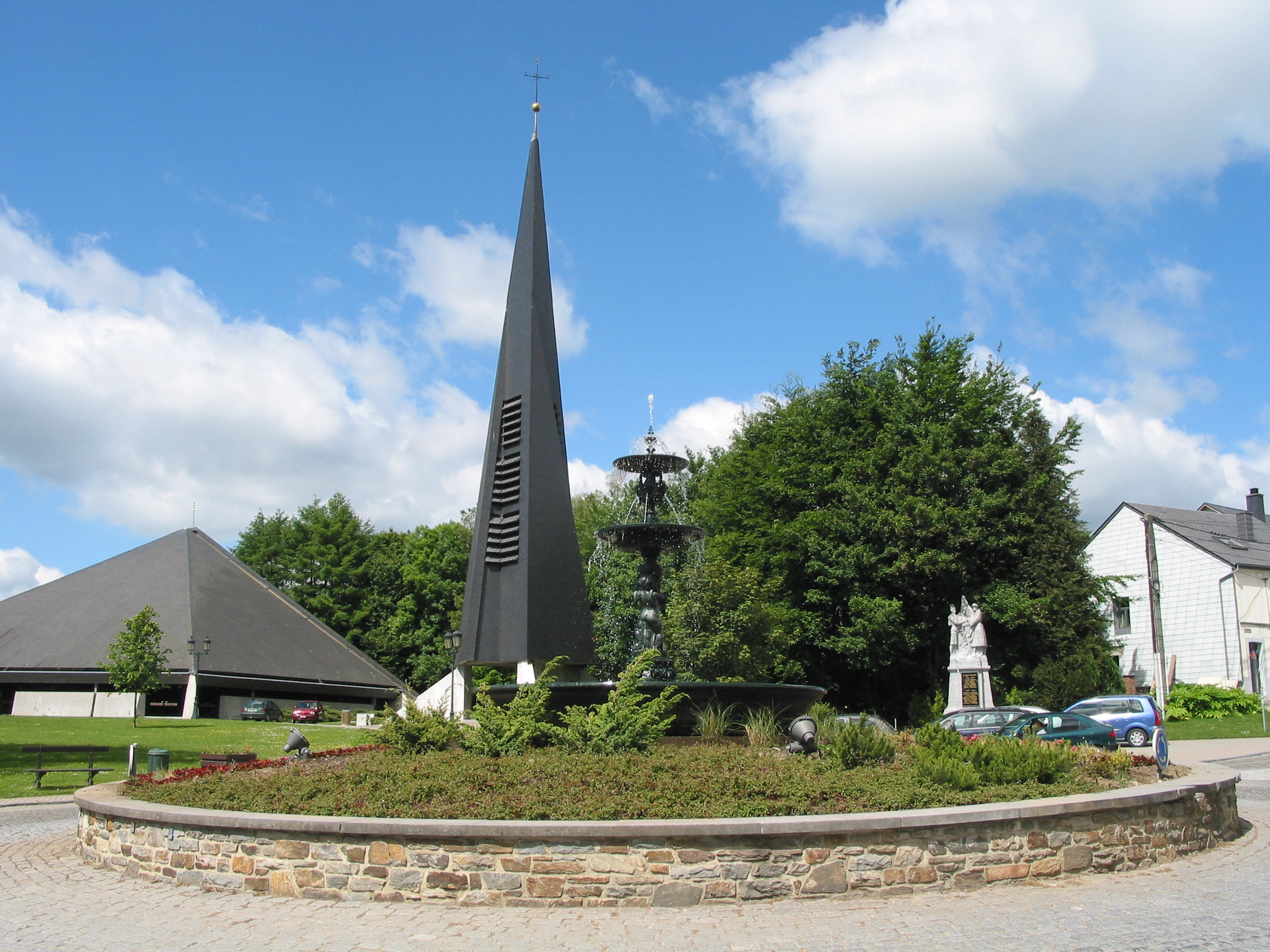
- The new church in Libramont

- Location of Libramont-Chevigny in Luxembourg province
- Interactive map of Libramont-Chevigny
- Location in Belgium
- Coordinates: 49°55′N 05°23′E
- Country: Belgium
- Community: French Community
- Region: Wallonia
- Province: Luxembourg
- Arrondissement: Neufchâteau

Government
  - Mayor: Laurence Crucifix
  - Governing parties: Chevi2018 (MR); LIBR'envol (DéFI/PS)

Area
  - Total: 179.21 km^{2} (69.19 sq mi)

Population (2018-01-01)
  - Total: 11,186
  - Density: 62.418/km^{2} (161.66/sq mi)
- Postal codes: 6800
- NIS code: 84077
- Area codes: 061
- Website: libramont-chevigny.be

Libramont-Chevigny (French pronunciation: [libʁamɔ̃ ʃəviɲi]; Walloon: Libråmont) is a municipality of Wallonia located in the province of Luxembourg, Belgium.

On 1 February 2015, the municipality, which covers 177.86 km^{2}, had 10,955 inhabitants, giving a population density of 61,59 inhabitants per km^{2}.

The municipality consists of the following districts: Bras, Freux, Libramont, Moircy, Recogne, Remagne, Sainte-Marie-Chevigny, and Saint-Pierre. Other population centers include:

- Bernimont
- Bonnerue
- Bougnimont
- Chenet
- Flohimont
- Jenneville
- Lamouline
- Laneuville
- Neuvillers
- Nimbermont
- Ourt
- Presseux
- Renaumont
- Rondu
- Sberchamps
- Séviscourt
- Wideumont

The Ourthe Occidentale river originates in the municipality of Libramont-Chevigny, near the hamlet of Ourt.

== Notable people from Libramont-Chevigny ==
- Nade Dieu (born 1973), actress
- Jodie Devos (1988-2024), operatic soprano
- Fiona Ferro (born 1997), tennis player
- Guillaume François (born 1990), football player
- Anne-Catherine Gillet (born 1975), operatic soprano
- David Henen (born 1996), football player
- Marie Howet (1897–1984), expressionist painter
- Françoise Lalande (born 1941), writer
- Arnaud de Lie (born 2002), cyclist

== See also ==
- List of protected heritage sites in Libramont-Chevigny
