= Slimane Zeghidour =

French writer (born 1953)

Suleiman Zeghidour
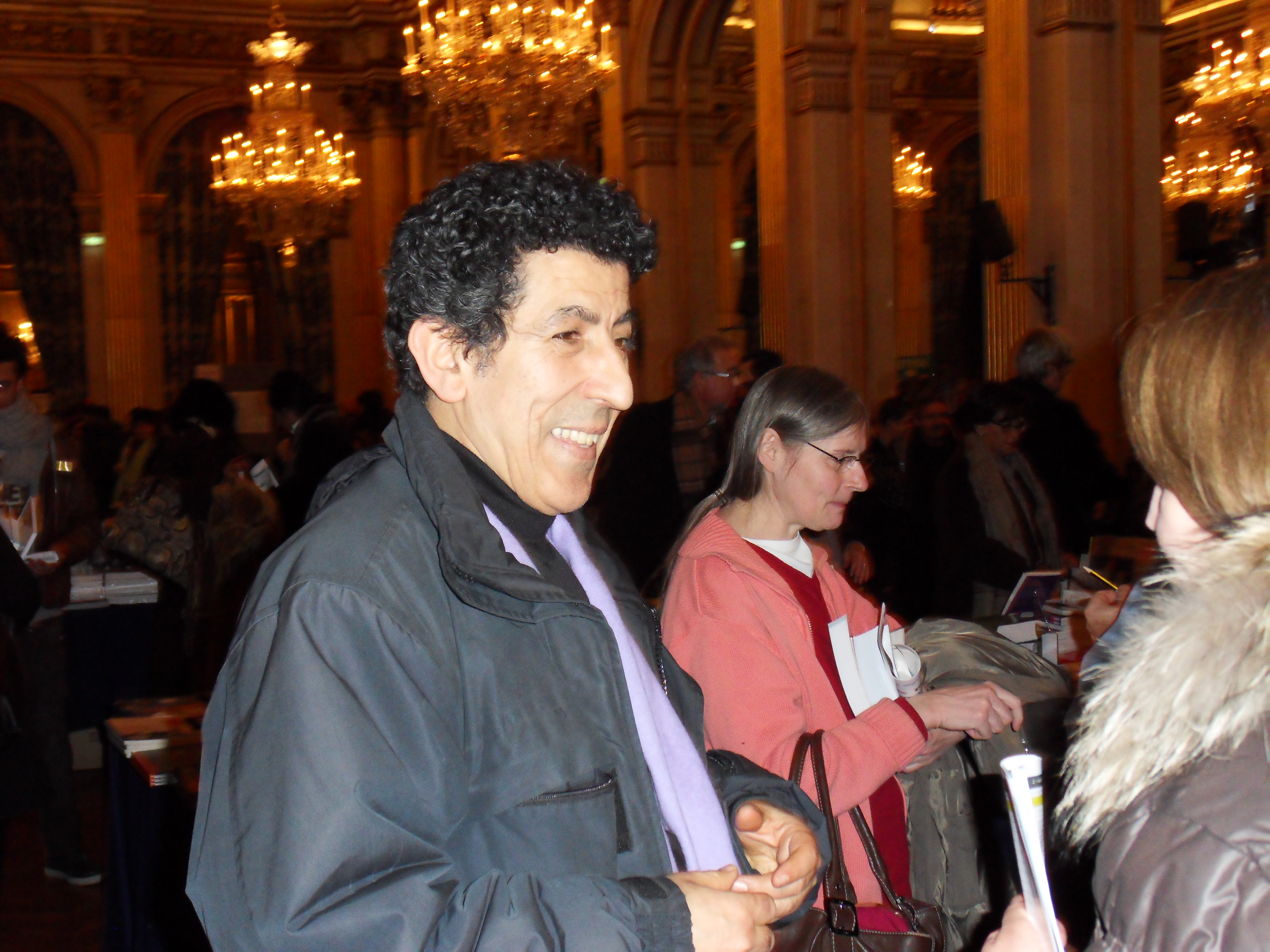
- Zeghidour in 2012
- Born: 20 September 1953 (age 72); Eraguene, Algeria

Slimane Zeghidour is an Algerian-French writer and journalist. He was born in the Petite Kabylie region of Algeria and moved to France in 1974, where he has been living since. He is currently Chief Editor of TV5Monde. His career includes leading researcher at the French Institute for International and Strategic Affairs (IRIS) and teaching geopolitics of religions at the Universities of Poitiers and Menton.

== Career ==
Zeghidour began his professional career as a reporter for numerous international newspapers. He conducted many major investigations for 25 years on Latin America, the Middle East, Central Asia, and Russia, as well as specializing in the reality and life of Latin Americans of Arab origin. In 1995, he received the prize "Archivio Disarmo - Golden Doves for Peace" from IRIAD.

== Opinions ==
Slimane Zeghidour believes that the far-right parties in Europe play with identity and Christian values, and accuse Islam of being their enemy, who threatens their identity. In his definition, Suleiman believes that identity is an ideological concept rather than a reality, and all the answers to what identity is will be ideological, not real. At the same time, he advises to not confuse the concept of identity with heritage. According to Suleiman, identity changes and cannot be fixed; there is no single identity, and it cannot be determined only through religion, culture, or language, because everything creates identity.

Regarding the revolutions in the Arab countries, especially the revolutions of the Arab Spring, Zeghidour sees or rather considered that what is happening in the Arab countries is not necessarily a revolution, but rather a reaction to every case of asphyxiation and accumulation resulting from the difficult conditions experienced by the Arab peoples. He criticizes the revolutionaries’ perception of the revolution and their failure to plan for what is going on. That is why he insists on calling what is happening on the public outrage that has resulted from the accumulation of difficulties and disappointments, but at the same time, however, it stresses that these protests are far better than the stalemate in the Arab countries.

Zeghidour believes that religion is not a source of real conflict. He also emphasizes that the Palestinian-Israeli conflict is not a religious conflict, and that Jews are not trying to bring Palestinian Muslims and Christians into Judaism and vice versa. He has also mentioned that Jews are not trying to demolish mosques and expel Muslims, and Muslims also did not want to demolish synagogues and expel Jews from them. The problem concerns the sense of patriotism, that is, the conflict over a very small land of six and a half million Israelis and five and a half million Palestinians. That is about 12 million people in 34,000 square kilometers.

== Works ==
Slimane Zeghidour has published several books, perhaps the most notably:

- Daily life in Mecca, Muhammad to this day (Arabic: alhayaat alyawmia fi maka, muhamad hataa yawmina hadha).
- Islam (Arabic: al'iislam).
- The man who wanted to meet the God (Arabic: alrajul aladhi 'arad 'an yaltaqi al'iilah).
