= Bastogne =

Municipality in Wallonia, Belgium

Bastogne: Bastenaken (Dutch); Bastenach (German)
- City and municipality
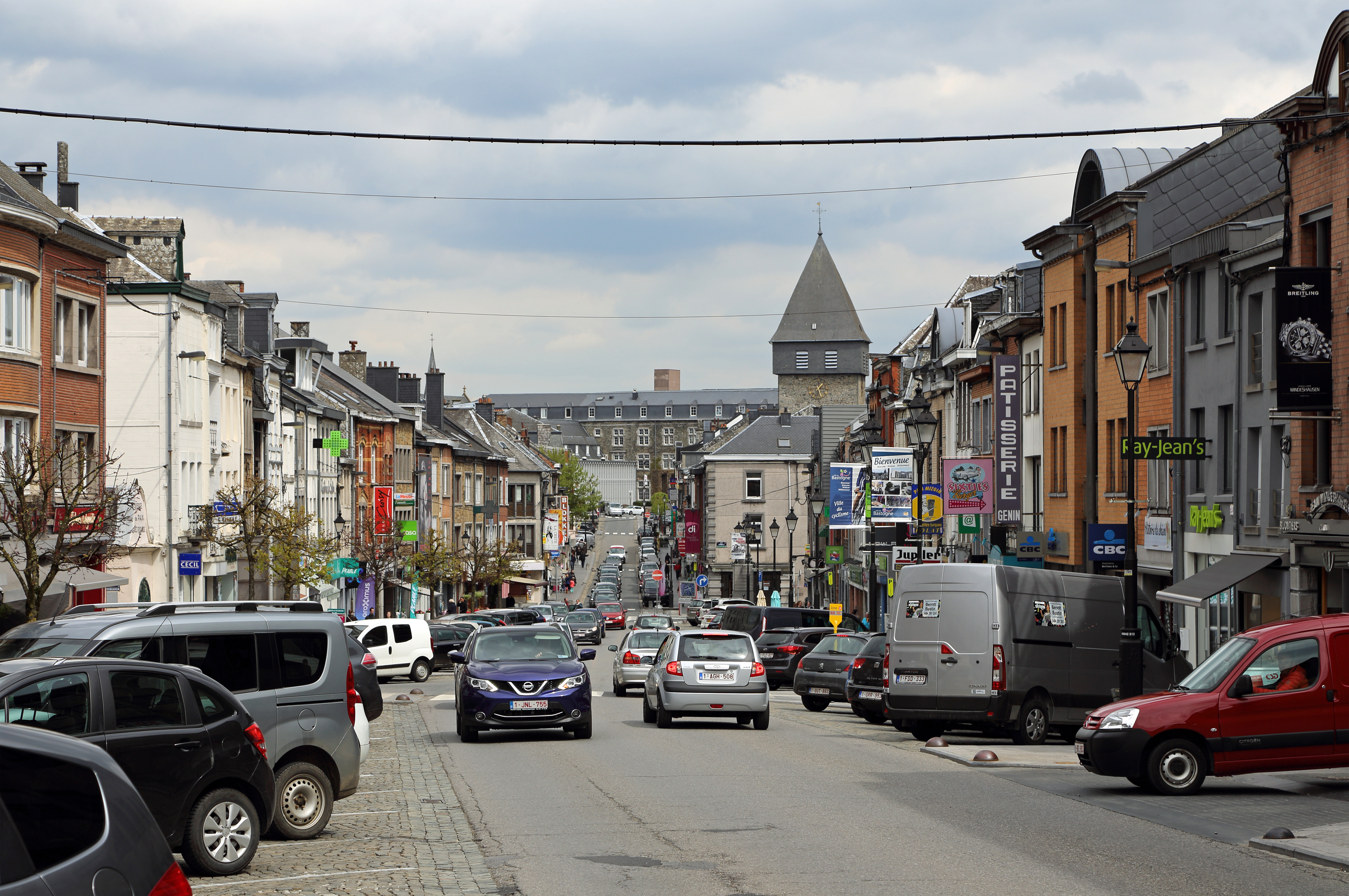

- Flag Coat of arms

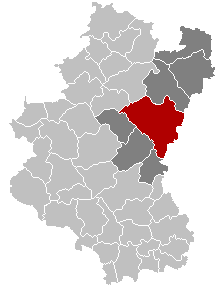
- Location of Bastogne in Luxembourg province
- Interactive map of Bastogne
- Location in Belgium
- Coordinates: 50°0.25′N 05°43.2′E
- Country: Belgium
- Community: French Community
- Region: Wallonia
- Province: Luxembourg
- Arrondissement: Bastogne

Government
  - Mayor: Benoît Lutgen (cdH)
  - Governing party: LDB-cdH

Area
  - Total: 264.69 km^{2} (102.20 sq mi)

Population (2025-01-01)
  - Total: 20,940
  - Density: 79.11/km^{2} (204.9/sq mi)
- Postal codes: 6600
- NIS code: 82039
- Area codes: 061
- Website: www.bastogne.be

Bastogne (French pronunciation: [bastɔɲ]; Dutch: Bastenaken [ˈbɑstəˌnaːkə(n)]; German: Bastnach/Bastenach [ˈbast(ə)nax]; Luxembourgish: Baaschtnech [ˈbaːʃtnəɕ]) is a city and municipality of Wallonia located in the province of Luxembourg in the Ardennes, Belgium.

The municipality consists of the following districts: Bastogne, Longvilly, Noville, Villers-la-Bonne-Eau, and Wardin. The town is situated on a ridge in the Ardennes at an elevation of 510 metres (1,670 ft).

On 2 December 2024, it merged with Bertogne into a new municipality.

== History ==
At the time of the Roman conquest the region of Bastogne was inhabited by the Treveri, a tribe of Gauls. A form of the name Bastogne was first mentioned only much later, in 634, when the local lord ceded these territories to the St. Maximin's Abbey, near Trier. A century later, the Bastogne area went to the nearby Prüm Abbey. The town of Bastogne and its marketplace are again mentioned in an 887 document. By the 13th century, Henry VII, Holy Roman Emperor and Count of Luxembourg, was minting coins in Bastogne. In 1332, John the Blind, his son, granted the city its charter and had it encircled by defensive walls, part of which, the current Porte de Trèves, still exists. In 1451, the lands of the county of Luxemburg were absorbed into the Duchy of Burgundy and as a result, Bastogne became part of the lands of the Spanish Crown when the Burgundian heir Charles became king of Spain in 1516.

The city's walls were quite effective at protecting it during the troubled times that followed. The city's economy actually flourished thanks to the renown of its agricultural and cattle fairs. In 1602, the walls successfully repelled an attack by forces of the Dutch Republic. In 1688, they were dismantled by order of King Louis XIV when the town was occupied by French forces during the Nine Years War.

The 19th century and Belgium's independence were favourable to Bastogne, as its forest products and cattle fairs became better known abroad. Several railway lines were built to link it to the neighbouring towns. This all came to an end with the German occupation during World War I.

=== World War II ===
Liberated by the Allies on 10 September 1944, Bastogne was attacked by German forces a few months later. Hitler's plan was to regain control of the Ardennes, splitting British from American forces, then advance to and reoccupy the strategic port of Antwerp and cut off the key Allied supply line. The Battle of the Bulge began on 16 December, when German artillery, taking advantage of cold and fog, attacked the American divisions deployed sparsely around Bastogne. A few days later, Brigadier General Anthony McAuliffe and the 101st Airborne Division along with elements of the 10th Armored Division and the 82nd Airborne Division, arrived to counter-attack but, after heavy fighting, became encircled within the town. On 22 December, German emissaries asked for the American surrender; McAuliffe answered tersely, "Nuts!" The next day the skies cleared, allowing Allied air forces to retaliate and to drop much-needed food, medicine, and weapons to ground forces. On 26 December, the Third U.S. Army, under the command of General George S. Patton, arrived and broke the siege. The official end of the Battle of Bastogne occurred three weeks later, when all fighting in the area ceased.

Bastogne is the terminus of the Liberty Road, the commemorative way that marks the path of liberating Allied forces, and of the Third Army that subsequently relieved Bastogne.

== Geography ==
Bastogne is located in the Belgian Ardennes, in the east of the province of Luxembourg. The city is 12 km (7.5 mi) away from the Luxembourg border. Its altitude is 515 m (1,690 ft) high on the ridge line separating the catchment areas of the Rhine and Meuse. It is the 9th largest municipality in Belgium and the third largest in the province (after Libramont-Chevigny and Léglise). In terms of population, it is the 4th largest municipality in the province after Arlon, Marche-en-Famenne and Aubange.

The 50th degree of north latitude crosses the city.

The municipality of Bastogne comprises five sections (Bastogne proper, Longvilly, Noville, Villers-la-Bonne-Eau, and Wardin) which were separate municipalities before the 1977 merger of municipalities. Each contains a number of villages.

- Bastogne: Bizory, Chifontaine, Hemroulle, Isle-la-Hesse, Isle-le-Pré, Savy, Senonchamps;
- Longvilly: Al-Hez, Arloncourt, Bourcy, Horritine, Michamps, Moinet, Oubourcy;
- Noville: Cobru, Fagnoux, Foy, Hardigny, Luzery, Rachamps, Recogne, Vaux, Wicourt;
- Villers-la-Bonne-Eau: Livarchamps, Losange, Lutrebois, Lutremange, Remoifosse;
- Wardin: Benonchamps, Bras, Harzy, Mageret, Marenwez, Marvie, Mont, Neffe.

== Climate ==
Bastogne has an oceanic climate similar to the remainder of Belgium, but with more continental influences due to it being inland and elevated in comparison to lowland areas nearer the Atlantic. In spite of this the winters are heavily moderated for its latitude and although snowfall and frosts are common, means remain just above freezing.

Climate data for Bastogne (1981–2010 normals; sunshine 1984–2013)
Month	Jan	Feb	Mar	Apr	May	Jun	Jul	Aug	Sep	Oct	Nov	Dec	Year
Mean daily maximum °C (°F)	3.1 (37.6)	4.2 (39.6)	8.2 (46.8)	12.1 (53.8)	16.3 (61.3)	19.1 (66.4)	21.4 (70.5)	21.1 (70.0)	17.2 (63.0)	12.7 (54.9)	7.0 (44.6)	3.8 (38.8)	12.3 (54.1)
Daily mean °C (°F)	0.3 (32.5)	0.8 (33.4)	4.1 (39.4)	7.1 (44.8)	11.3 (52.3)	14.1 (57.4)	16.3 (61.3)	15.9 (60.6)	12.5 (54.5)	8.8 (47.8)	4.2 (39.6)	1.3 (34.3)	8.2 (46.8)
Mean daily minimum °C (°F)	−2.4 (27.7)	−2.7 (27.1)	0.0 (32.0)	2.2 (36.0)	6.3 (43.3)	9.0 (48.2)	11.2 (52.2)	10.7 (51.3)	7.8 (46.0)	5.1 (41.2)	1.4 (34.5)	−1.2 (29.8)	4.0 (39.2)
Average precipitation mm (inches)	104.9 (4.13)	83.2 (3.28)	86.9 (3.42)	68.5 (2.70)	78.5 (3.09)	79.4 (3.13)	76.9 (3.03)	81.9 (3.22)	78.7 (3.10)	91.4 (3.60)	90.0 (3.54)	105.5 (4.15)	1,025.8 (40.39)
Average precipitation days	14.4	12.3	14.4	10.8	12.1	11.7	11.9	11.1	11.1	12.8	14.5	15.2	152.1
Mean monthly sunshine hours	43	70	117	165	193	194	212	200	140	100	46	34	1,513
Source: Royal Meteorological Institute

== Sights ==
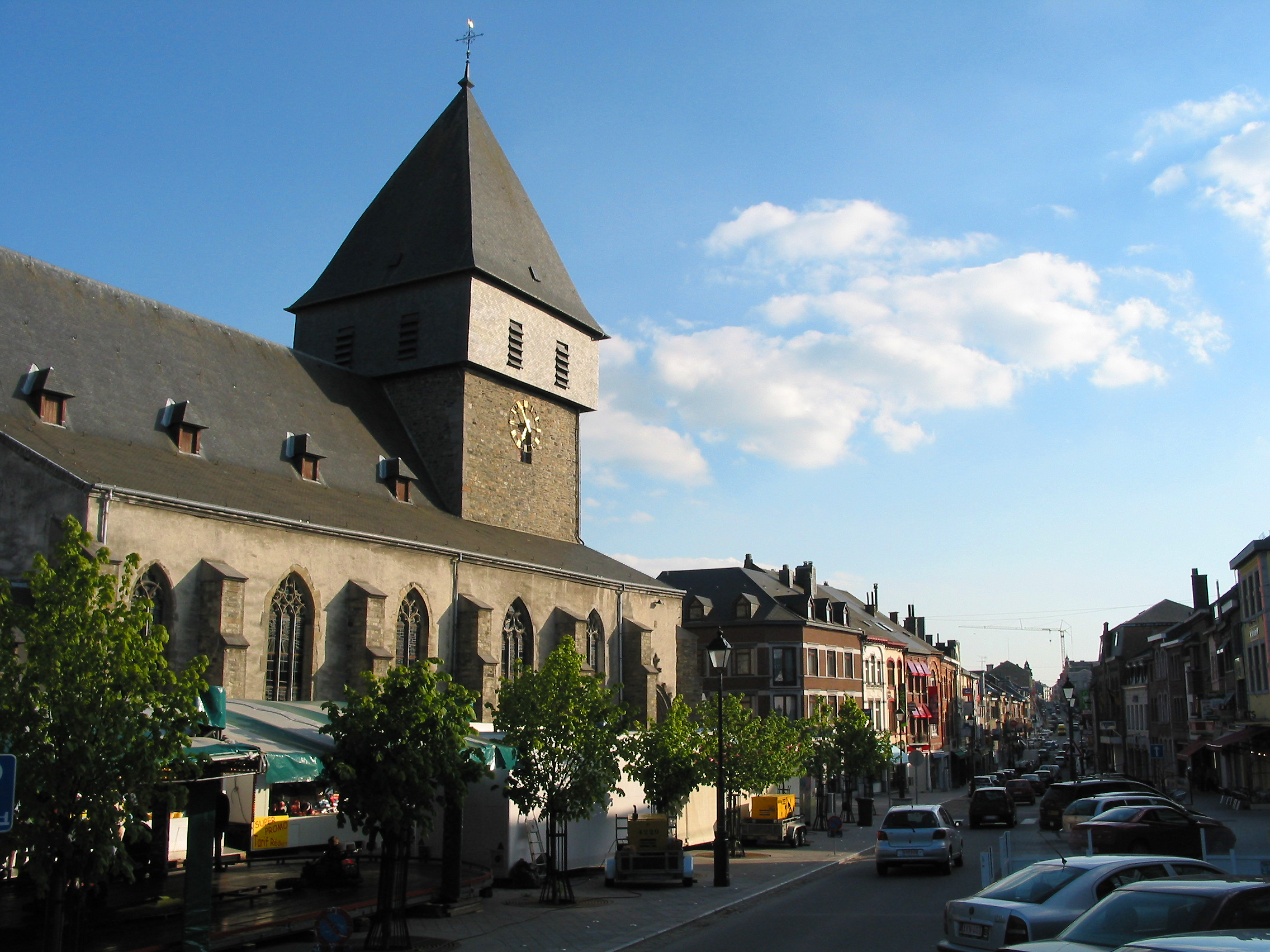
St. Pierre Church

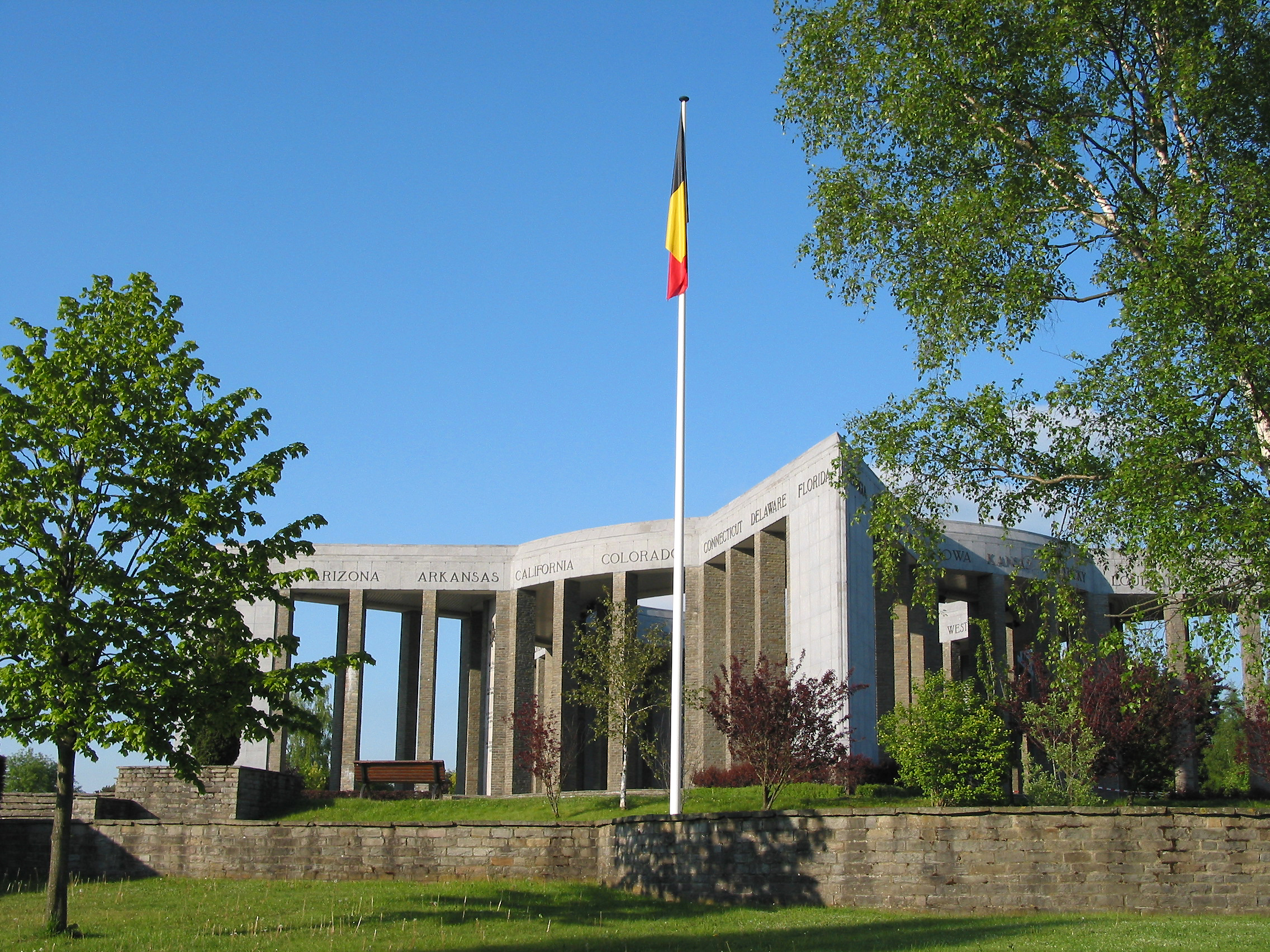
The Battle of the Bulge Monument to soldiers who fought in the Battle of the Bulge in 1944

- The 101st Airborne Museum includes dioramas and more about the experiences of soldiers and civilians during the siege of the city during World War II.
- The Bastogne Barracks museum is free and operated by the Belgian Army. It is located in the barracks used as the headquarters of the U.S. 101st Airborne during the Siege of Bastogne. It features an extensive collection of restored tanks and military vehicles as well as a guided tour of the underground barracks and artifacts from U.S., German and British forces. The base ("caserne") is about 5 blocks from the Place de St. Pierre. The museum includes the basement office where General McAuliffe issued the famous "Nuts!" response to the German demand for surrender. Other rooms display artillery, small arms, radio and medical equipment. Belgian Army specialists guide visitors through the base.
- The Bastogne War Museum has many war artifacts and videos recreating the experience of the Battle of the Bulge for visitors.
- The Porte de Trèves, part of the defensive walls that had been erected in the 14th century by John the Blind, can still be seen.
- The Romanesque tower of St Pierre church and its baptismal fonts also date from the Middle Ages.
- The Battle of the Bulge Monument was erected near Bastogne in 1950 to honor the memory of American soldiers wounded or killed during the Battle of the Bulge.
- Monuments to Brigadier General McAuliffe, General Patton and others can be found around town.
- Recogne German war cemetery, 6 km to the north. Contains the graves of 6,807 German soldiers.

== Folklore ==
The key character of all legends about Bastogne is the so-called piche-cacaye. This is pronounced "pish-cackay".

== Demographics ==
Group of origin	Year		Year		Year		Year	
Group of origin	2000		2010		2020		2026	
Group of origin	Number	%	Number	%	Number	%	Number	%
Belgians with Belgian background	11,980	89,5	12,473	84	12,608	77,5	16,005	76,2
Belgians with foreign background	848	6,3	1,649	11,1	2,473	15,2	3,214	15,3
Neighboring country	342	2,55	479	3,22	675	4,14	825	4,05
EU27 (excluding neighboring country)	198	1,47	346	2,33	466	2,86	545	2,59
Outside EU 27	308	2,3	824	5,53	1,332	8,18	1,844	8,78
Non-Belgians	563	4,2	728	4,9	1,195	7,3	1,791	8,5
Neighboring country	197	1,47	308	2,97	366	2,24	511	2,43
EU27 (excluding neighboring country)	95	0,71	153	1,03	334	2,05	518	2,46
Outside EU 27	271	2,02	267	1,80	495	3,04	762	3,62
Total	13,391	100	14,850	100	16,276	100	21,010	100

== Transportation ==
Bastogne originally had an NMBS/SNCB railway line connecting it to Libramont and to Gouvy. Passenger trains to Gouvy stopped in 1984 and in the 1990s the line to Libramont was taken out of service. The two station buildings in Bastogne remain, but are now used for other purposes. Part of the rail line has been converted into a cycle path.

The city has two bus stations: Bastogne Nord and Bastogne Sud, supporting a rural shuttle from Bastogne Nord to Libramont stopping only at Bastogne Sud.

== Sports ==
- Bastogne is the halfway point of the Liège–Bastogne–Liège classic bicycle race, one of the oldest and most prestigious one-day events in the professional road cycling calendar, dating back to the late 19th century.
- The Circuit des Ardennes, which today refers to a bicycle race, used to refer to a 600 kilometres (370 mi) car race near Bastogne. The race used attracted famous enthusiasts, such as German Emperor William II. It was moved to Francorchamps around World War I, where it lives on as the Belgian Grand Prix.
