= Benoît Lutgen =

Belgian politician (born 1970)

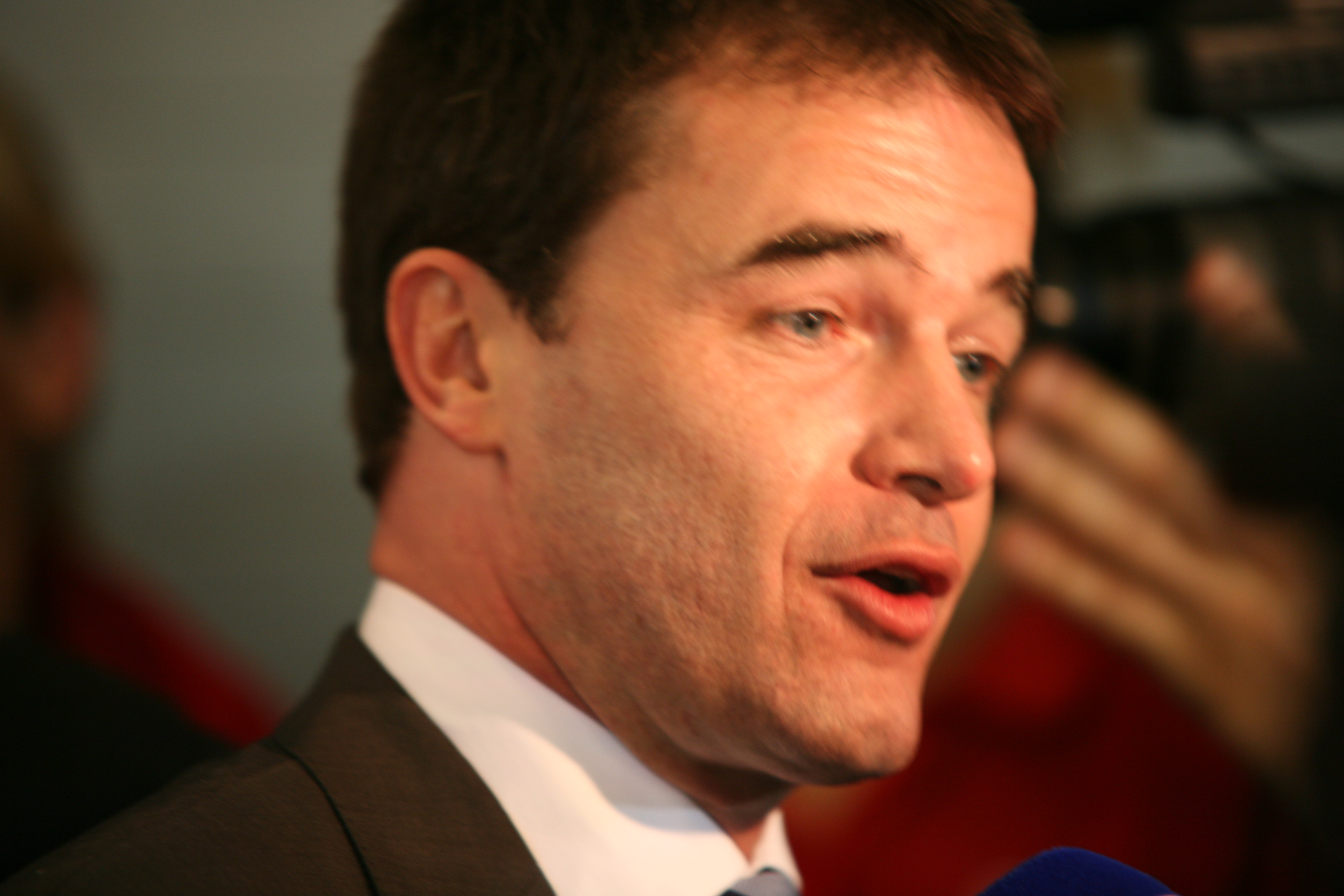
- Lutgen in 2007

Member of the European Parliament
- Incumbent
- Assumed office 2019
- Constituency: Belgium

Personal details
- Born: 10 March 1970 (age 56) Bastogne, Belgium
- Party: Centre démocrate humaniste

Benoît Lutgen (born 10 March 1970) is a Belgian politician who served as head of the Centre démocrate humaniste (Humanist Democrat Centre) political party in Belgium from 2011 to 2019.

== Early life ==
Benoît Lutgen was born on 10 March 1970 in Bastogne. His father was Guy Lutgen.

== Political career ==
=== Career in national politics ===
Previously, Lutgen was Secretary-General of the Centre démocrate humaniste from 2001 to 2002 and National Campaign Director for the party in 2004. Lutgen was Minister for Public Works, Agriculture, Rural Affairs, Nature, Forests and Heritage of Wallonia. He was previously Minister for Agriculture, Rural Affairs, the Environment and Tourism in the governments of Ministers-President Elio Di Rupo and Rudy Demotte from 2004 to 2009.

=== Member of the European Parliament, 2019–2024 ===
Lutgen has been a Member of the European Parliament since the 2019 elections. He has since been serving on the Committee on Transport and Tourism. In this capacity, he has been part of the Tourism Task Force (TTF). He has also been a substitute member of the Committee on Agriculture and Rural Development, where he served as rapporteur on the European Commission's 2023 proposal to revise the Industrial Emissions Directive.

In addition to his committee assignments, Lutgen is part of the Parliament's delegation with the United States. He is also a member of the European Parliament Intergroup on Disability and the European Parliament Intergroup on the Welfare and Conservation of Animals.

=== Member of the Belgian Parliament, 2024–present ===
He was elected to the Chamber of Representatives in the 2024 Belgian federal election.
