= I Am an American Soldier =

2007 documentary film

I Am an American Soldier: One Year in Iraq with the 101st Airborne
- An Army observation post in Samarra, Iraq.
- Directed by: John Laurence
- Produced by: John Laurence
- Starring: C Troop 1/33 Cav. 101st Airborne Divn. U.S. Army
- Cinematography: David Green; Andy Thompson
- Music by: David Mitcham [additional music by Bruce Springsteen, Pink Floyd, others.]
- Release date: 2007
- Running time: 101 minutes
- Country: United Kingdom
- Language: English

I Am an American Soldier is a 2007 documentary film about the Iraq War, produced by John Laurence; it is subtitled "One Year in Iraq with the 101st Airborne". It was entered into the World Documentary category of the 2007 Tribeca Festival.

== Synopsis ==
A company of American soldiers - ninety-two air assault troopers from the 3rd Brigade, 101st Airborne Division (Rakkasans) - are sent to fight a full year's tour of duty in Iraq.

== Access ==
The British/American filmmakers were given access to the soldiers for fourteen months: from September 2005, to November 2006, and accompanied them into the most dangerous places. The result is a feature film that attempts to examine the Iraq War with ruthless scrutiny, with honesty and fairness, and reveals courage of an uncommon kind.

Before they leave Fort Campbell, hundreds of soldiers shout “Hoo-ah” in response to their brigade commander's dramatic war speech in which he tells them to "look like a killer" at all times in Iraq. The film begins by demonstrating the lethal force of America's best-trained soldiers.

The soldiers of Charlie Troop find it increasingly difficult to carry out their mission in a hostile environment, full of deception and danger. A carefully planned attempt to destroy a team of insurgents who are firing rockets and mortars at them, the troops are sabotaged by the over-protective actions of a parent unit from the Third Infantry Division. Despite vigilant surveillance work, superior weapons and training, and all the energy of their warrior natures, the soldiers are thrown into the most frustrating mission conceivable.
