= William C. Coleman Jr. =

American politician (1925–2012)

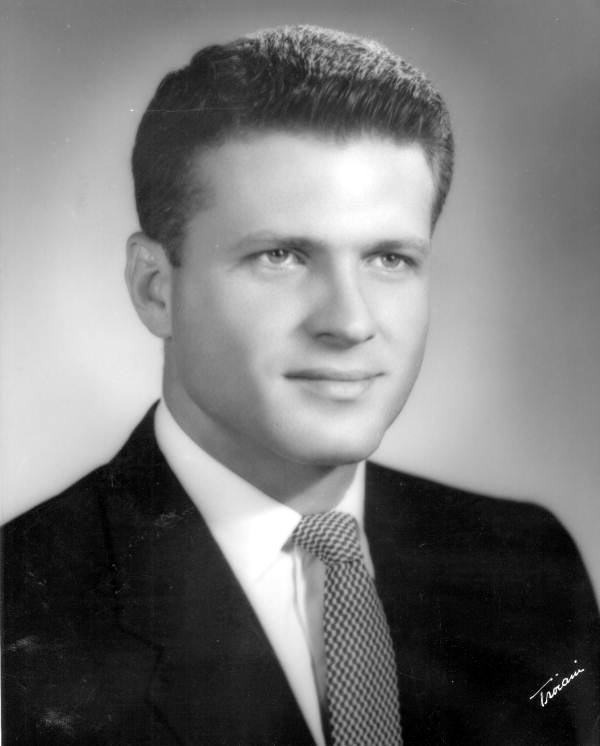
- Coleman in 1955

Member of the Florida House of Representatives from Orange County
- In office 1955–1956

Personal details
- Born: January 21, 1925 Martin, Tennessee, U.S.
- Died: December 13, 2012 (aged 87)
- Party: Republican

William C. Coleman Jr. (January 21, 1925 – December 13, 2012) was an American politician. He served as a Republican member of the Florida House of Representatives.

== Life and career ==
Coleman was born in Martin, Tennessee. He served in the 101st Airborne Division of the United States Army.

Coleman was an insurance agent.

Coleman served in the Florida House of Representatives from 1955 to 1956.

Coleman died on December 13, 2012, at the age of 87.
