= Mission Albany =

WWII US parachute mission

- Part of the American airborne landings in Normandy, Operation Overlord
- Insignia of the U.S. 101st Airborne Division.
Date	6–15 June 1944
Location	Normandy, France
Result	American victory

Belligerents
United States	Germany

Commanders and leaders
(United States) Maxwell D. Taylor	(Nazi Germany) Friedrich von der Heydte

Units involved
101st Airborne Division; 65th Armored Field Artillery Battalion; Company A, 746th Tank Battalion	6th Fallschirmjager Regiment; German III Battalion-191st Artillery Regiment.

Strength
6,928 paratroops 2,300 seaborne glider troop reinforcements	Approximately 6,000 (7 battalions infantry, one regiment artillery)

Casualties and losses
(Campaign); 546 killed 2,217 wounded 1,907 missing	(campaign losses including against the VII Corps) Estimated 4,500 killed, wounded, and missing

Mission Albany was a parachute combat assault at night by the U.S. 101st Airborne Division on June 6, 1944, part of the American airborne landings in Normandy during World War II. It was the opening step of Operation Neptune, the assault portion of the Allied invasion of Normandy, Operation Overlord. Five hours ahead of the D-Day landings, 6,928 paratroopers jumped from 443 C-47 Skytrain troop-carrier planes into the southeast corner of France's Cotentin Peninsula. The troops were meant to land in an area of roughly 15 square miles (39 km^{2}), but were scattered by bad weather and German ground fire over an area twice as large, with four sticks dropped as far as 20 miles (32 km) away.

The division took most of its objectives on D-Day, but required four days to consolidate its scattered units and complete its mission of securing the left flank and rear of the U.S. VII Corps, reinforced by 2,300 glider infantry troops who landed by sea.

== Overview ==
The 101st Airborne Division's objectives were to secure the four causeway exits behind Utah Beach, destroy a German coastal artillery battery at Saint-Martin-de-Varreville, capture buildings nearby at Mésières believed used as barracks and a command post for the artillery battery, capture the Douve River lock at la Barquette (opposite Carentan), capture two footbridges spanning the Douve at la Porte opposite Brévands, destroy the highway bridges over the Douve at Sainte-Come-du-Mont, and secure the Douve River valley.

In the process units would also disrupt German communications, establish roadblocks to hamper the movement of German reinforcements, establish a defensive line between the beachhead and Valognes, clear the area of the drop zones to the unit boundary at Les Forges, and link up with the U.S. 82nd Airborne Division.

German forces opposing the operation included the 3rd Battalion, 1058th Grenadier Regiment (91st Air Landing Division) in the vicinity of Saint Come-du-Mont, the 919th Grenadier Regiment (709th Infantry Division) behind Utah Beach, the 191st Artillery Regiment (105mm mountain howitzer, 91st AL Div), and the 6th Parachute Regiment, sent to Carentan during D-Day.

== Mission description ==
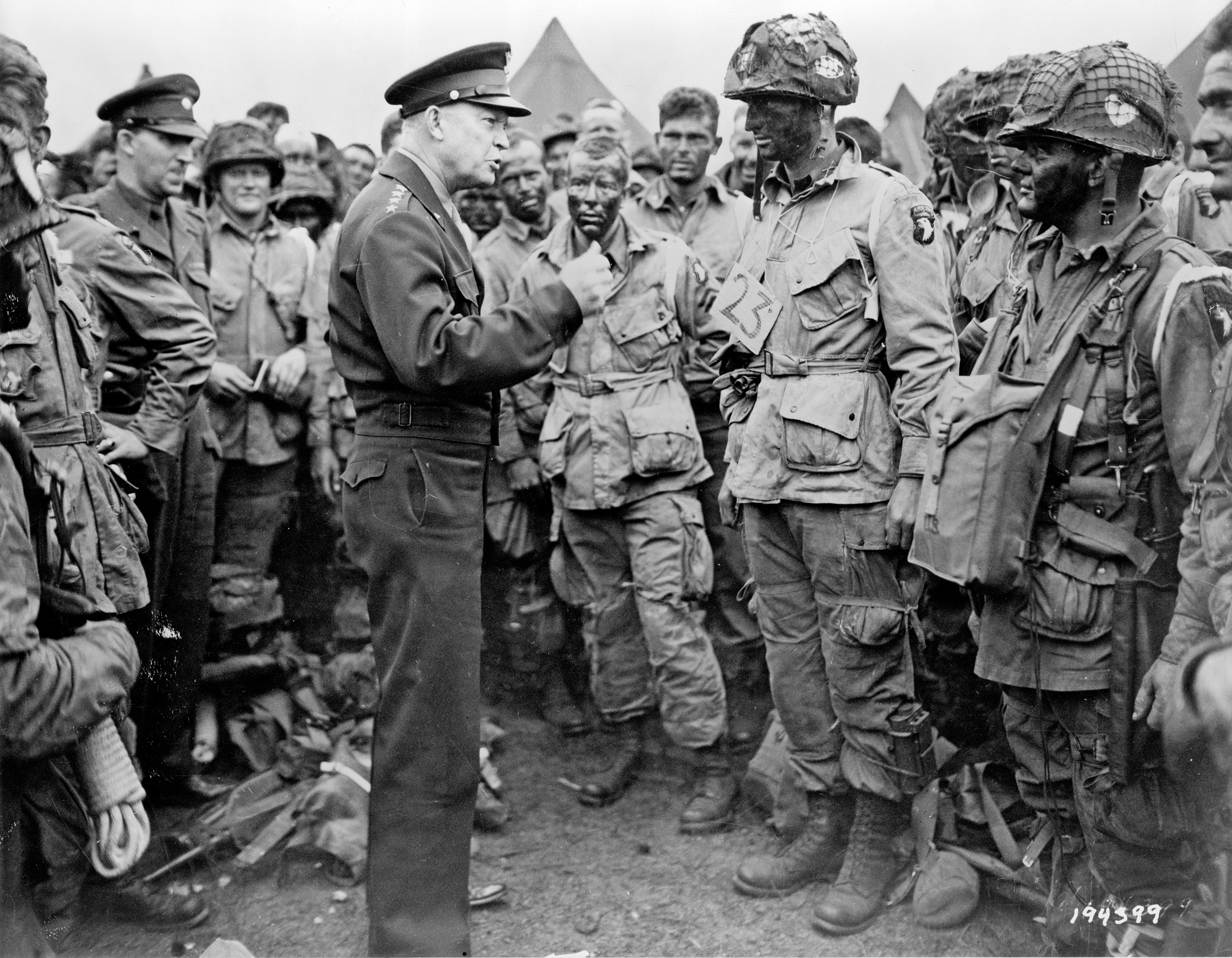
General Dwight D. Eisenhower speaking with First lieutenant Wallace Strobel and men of Company E of the 2nd Battalion, 502nd Parachute Infantry Regiment on June 5. The placard around Strobel's neck indicates he is the jumpmaster for chalk #23 of the 438th TCG.

Albany was the first of two parachute missions; the 82nd Airborne Division dropped one hour later in Mission Boston. Each mission consisted of three regiment-sized air landings. The drop zones of the 101st Airborne Division were east and south of Sainte-Mère-Église and lettered A, C and D from north to south. (Drop Zone B had belonged to the 501st Parachute Infantry Regiment (PIR) before the plan was changed on May 27.)

Each parachute infantry regiment was transported by three or four "serials" (formations containing 36, 45, or 54 C-47s); the mission involved a total of 432 aircraft in ten serials. The planes, individually numbered within a serial by "chalk numbers" (literally numbers chalked on the airplanes to help paratroopers board the correct one), were organized into flights in trail, in a close pattern called "vee's of vee's": three planes in triangular vee's arranged in a larger vee of nine planes. The serials were scheduled over the drop zones at 6-minute intervals. The paratroopers were organized into "sticks", a planeload of 15 to 18 men.

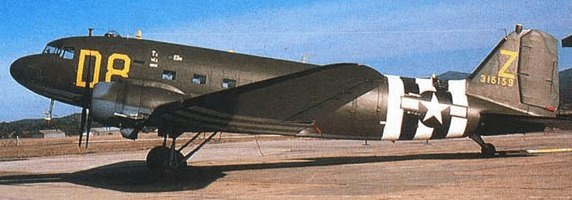
C-47 of the 439th Troop Carrier Group, which carried the 506th Parachute Infantry Regiment into Normandy. Group commander's aircraft, chalk #1 of serial 11, assigned to Drop Zone C.

Thirty minutes before the main jumps, three teams of pathfinders jumped into each drop zones set up navigation aids, including Eureka radar transponder beacons and marker lights, to help the C-47s find their way in the dark.

To achieve surprise, the parachute drops were routed to approach Normandy at low altitude from the west. The serials began to take off at 22:30 on June 5, assembled into formations, and flew southwest over the English Channel at 500 feet (150 m) MSL to remain below German radar coverage. Once over water all lights except formation lights were turned off, and these were reduced to their lowest practical intensity. At a stationary marker boat code-named "Hoboken" and carrying a Eureka beacon, they made a left turn to the southeast and flew between the Channel Islands of Guernsey and Alderney to their initial point on the Cotentin coast at Portbail, code-named "Muleshoe".

Over the Cotentin Peninsula, numerous factors reduced the accuracy of the drops. A solid cloud bank over the western half of the 22-mile (35 km) peninsula at penetration altitude (1500 feet MSL), an opaque ground fog over many drop zones, and intense German antiaircraft fire ("flak") broke up and dispersed many formations. All of these factors magnified the imprecision that flowed from the decision to make a massive parachute drop at night.

== D-Day assault ==
=== Drop Zone A ===
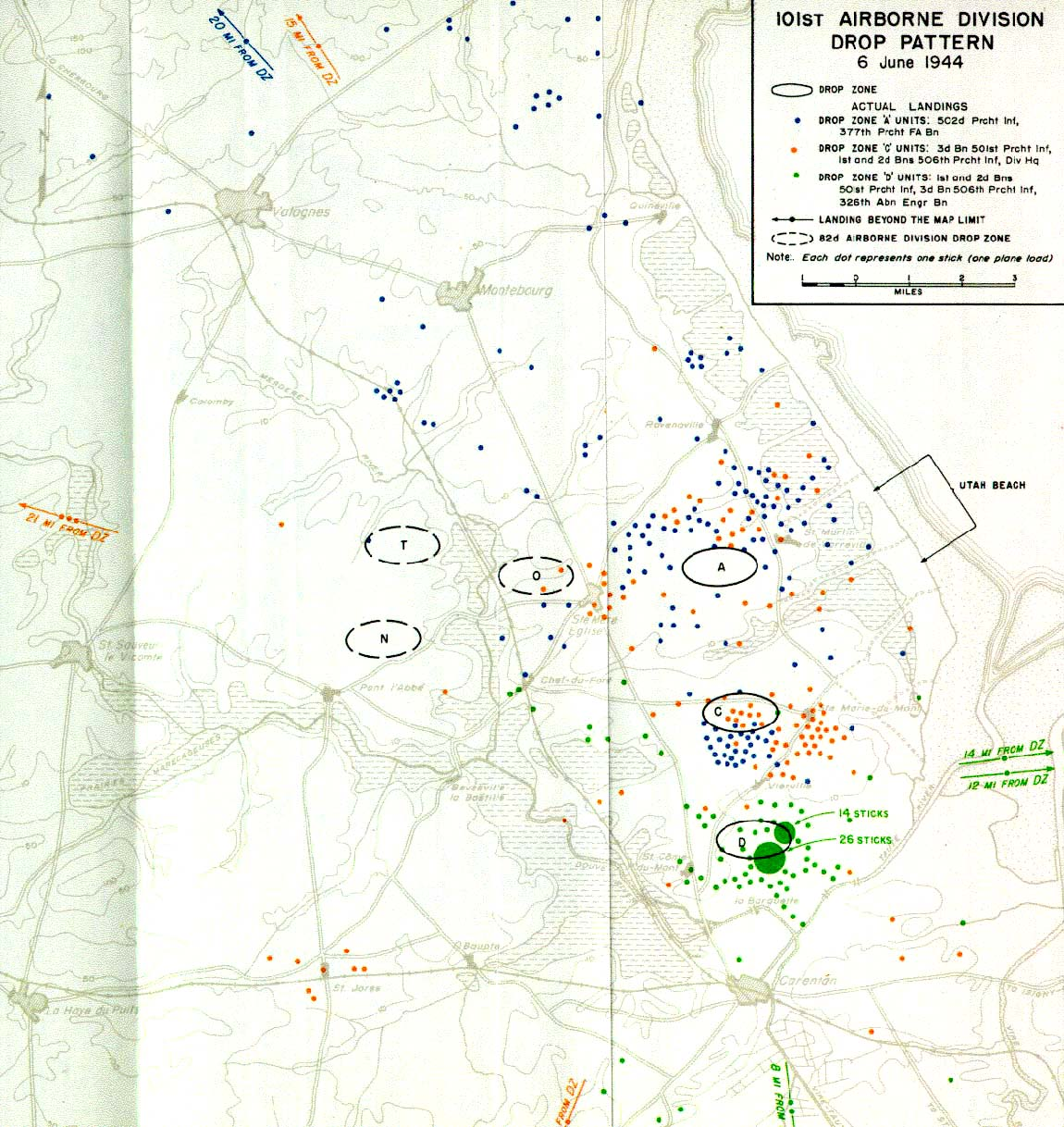
101st Airborne drop pattern, D-Day, 6 June 1944.

The paratroopers of the 101st Airborne Division "Screaming Eagles" jumped between 00:48 and 01:40 British Double Summer Time on June 6. The first wave, inbound to Drop Zone A (the northernmost), was not surprised by the cloud bank and maintained formation, but navigating errors and a lack of Eureka signal caused the first error. Although the 2nd Battalion, 502nd PIR was dropped as a compact unit, it jumped on the wrong drop zone, while its commander, Lieutenant Colonel Steve A. Chappuis, came down virtually alone on the correct drop zone. Chappuis and his stick captured the coastal battery soon after assembling, but found that it had already been dismantled after an air raid.

Most of the remainder of the 502nd PIR (70 of 80 groups) dropped in a disorganized pattern around the impromptu drop zone set up by the pathfinders near the beach. The commanders of the 1st and 3rd Battalions, Lieutenant Colonels Patrick F. Cassidy and Robert G. Cole, took charge of small groups and accomplished all of their D-Day missions. Cassidy's group took Saint Martin-de-Varreville by 06:30, sent a patrol under Staff Sergeant Harrison C. Summers to seize the "XYZ" objective, a barracks at Les Mézières, and set up a thin line of defense from Foucarville to Beuzeville-au-Plain. Cole's group moved during the night from near Saint Mère Église to the Varreville battery, then continued on and captured Exit 3 at 07:30. They held the position during the morning until relieved by troops moving inland from Utah Beach. Both commanders found Exit 4 covered by German artillery fire and Cassidy recommended to the 4th Infantry Division that it not use the exit.

The division's parachute artillery did not fare nearly as well. Its drop was one of the worst of the operation, losing all but one howitzer and dropping all but two of 54 loads four to twenty miles (6.4 to 32.2 km) to the north, where most ultimately became casualties.

=== Drop Zone C ===
The second wave, assigned to drop the 506th PIR on Drop Zone C one mile (1.6 km) west of Sainte Marie-du-Mont, was badly dispersed by the clouds, then subjected to intense antiaircraft fire for ten miles (16 km). Three of the 81 C-47s were lost before or during the jump. One, piloted by First Lieutenant Marvin F. Muir of the 439th Troop Carrier Group, caught fire. Muir held the aircraft steady while the men jumped, then died when the plane crashed immediately afterward, for which he was awarded the Distinguished Service Cross. Despite the opposition, the 506th's 1st Battalion (the original division reserve) was dropped accurately on DZ C, landing 2/3 of its sticks and the 506th's regimental commander, Colonel Robert Sink, on or within a mile of the drop zone.

The 2nd Battalion, much of which had jumped too far west near Sainte Mère Église, eventually assembled near Foucarville at the northern edge of the 101st Airborne Division's objective area. It fought its way to the hamlet of le Chemin near the Houdienville causeway by mid-afternoon, but found that the 4th Division had already seized the exit hours before. The 3rd Battalion of the 501st PIR, flown by the 435th TCG, was also assigned to jump onto DZ C, however it was partly scattered. BG Taylor, jumping from the lead aircraft of the 435th, landed on the DZ and assessed the situation and decided to take over the mission of securing the exits. An ad hoc company-sized team that included the division commander, Major General Maxwell D. Taylor, reached the Pouppeville exit at 0600. After a six-hour house-clearing battle with elements of the German 1058th Grenadier Regiment, the group secured the exit shortly before 4th Division troops arrived to link up.

=== Drop Zone D ===
The third wave also encountered severe flak, losing six aircraft. The troop carriers still made an accurate drop, placing 94 of 132 sticks on or close to the drop zone, but part of the DZ was covered by pre-registered German machine gun and mortar fire that inflicted heavy casualties before many troops could get out of their chutes. Among the killed were two of the three battalion commanders and the executive officer (XO) of the 3rd Battalion, 506th PIR.

The surviving battalion commander, Lieutenant Colonel Robert A. Ballard, gathered 250 troopers and advanced toward Saint Côme-du-Mont to complete his mission of destroying the highway bridges over the Douve. Less than half a mile from his objective at les Droueries he was stopped by elements of battalion III./1058 Grenadier-Rgt. Another group of 50 men, assembled by the regimental S-3, Major Richard J. Allen, attacked the same area from the east at Basse-Addeville but was also pinned down.

The commander of the 501st PIR, Colonel Howard R. Johnson, collected 150 troops and captured the main objective, the la Barquette lock, by 04:00. After establishing defensive positions, Colonel Johnson went back to the drop zone and assembled another 100 men, including Allen's group, to reinforce the bridgehead. Despite naval gunfire support from the cruiser Quincy, Ballard's battalion was unable to take Saint Côme-du-Mont or join Colonel Johnson.

The S-3 officer of the 3rd Battalion, 506th, Captain Charles G. Shettle, put together a platoon and achieved another objective by seizing two foot bridges near la Porte at 04:30 and crossed to the east bank. When their ammunition drew low after knocking out several machine gun emplacements, the small force withdrew to the west bank. It doubled in size overnight as stragglers came in, and repulsed a German probe across the bridges.

=== Other actions ===
Two other noteworthy actions took place near Sainte Marie-du-Mont by units of the 506th PIR, both of which involved the seizure and destruction of batteries of 105mm howitzers of the German III Battalion-191st Artillery Regiment. During the morning, a squad-size patrol of troopers, mainly from Company E of the 506th PIR under First Lieutenant Richard Winters overwhelmed a force three or four times its size and destroyed four guns at Brécourt Manor.

Around noon, while reconnoitering the area by jeep, Colonel Sink, commanding the 506th PIR, received word that a second battery of four guns had been discovered at Holdy, a manor between his command post and Sainte Marie-du-Mont, and the defenders had a force of some 70 paratroopers pinned down. Captain Lloyd E. Patch (Headquarters Company, 1st/506th) and Captain Knut H. Raudstein (Company C of the 506th PIR) led an additional 70 paratroops to Holdy and enveloped the position. The combined force then continued on to seize Sainte Marie-du-Mont. A platoon of the 502nd PIR, left to hold the battery, destroyed three of the four guns before Colonel Sink could send four jeeps to save them for the 101st Airborne Division's use.

At the end of D-Day, Major General Taylor and the commander of the 101st Airborne Division Artillery, Brigadier General Anthony McAuliffe returned from their foray at Pouppeville. Taylor had control of about 2,500 of his 6,600 men, most of which were in the vicinity of the 506th's command post at Culoville, with the thin defense line west of Saint Germain-du-Varreville, or the division reserve at Blosville. Two glider airlifts had brought in scant reinforcements and had resulted in the death of his assistant division commander, Brigadier General Don Pratt. The 327th Glider Infantry Regiment (GIR) had come across Utah Beach but only its third battalion (1st Battalion, 401st GIR) had reported in.

The 101st Airborne Division had accomplished its most important mission of securing the beach exits, but had a tenuous hold on positions near the Douve River, over which the Germans could still move armored units. The three groups clustered there had tenuous contact with each other but none with the rest of the division. The loss of much radio equipment during the drops exacerbated his control problems. Major General Taylor made destroying the Douve bridges the division's top priority and delegated the task to Colonel Sink, who issued orders for the 1st Battalion, 401st GIR to lead three battalions south the next morning.

== Air movement table - mission Albany ==
Serial	Airborne Unit	Troop carrier Group	# of C-47s	UK Base	Drop Zone	Drop Zone Time
1	Pathfinders	1st Pathfinder Prov.	3	RAF North Witham	A	0020
2	Pathfinders	1st Pathfinder Prov.	3	RAF North Witham	C	0025
6A	Pathfinders	1st Pathfinder Prov.	2	RAF North Witham	C	0027
3	Pathfinders	1st Pathfinder Prov.	3	RAF North Witham	D	0035
7	2nd Bn 502nd PIR	438th TCG	36	RAF Greenham Common	A	0048
8	3rd Bn 502nd PIR	438th TCG	45	RAF Greenham Common	A	0050
9	1st Bn 502nd PIR	436th TCG	36	RAF Membury	A	0055
10	377th Para FA	436th TCG	54	RAF Membury	A	0108
11	1st Bn 506th PIR	439th TCG	45	RAF Upottery	C	0114
12	2nd Bn 506th PIR	439th TCG	36	RAF Upottery	C	0120
13	3rd Bn 501st PIR; Div HQ	435th TCG	45	RAF Welford	C	0120
14	1st Bn 501st PIR	441st TCG	45	RAF Merryfield	D	0126
15	2d Bn 501st PIR	441st TCG	45	RAF Merryfield	D	0134
16	3rd Bn 506th PIR; Co C 326th Engr Bn	440th TCG	45	RAF Exeter	D	0140

SOURCE: D-Day Etat des Lieux

== Saint Côme-du-Mont ==
The 101st Airborne Division fought two battles in Normandy after D-Day. The first, at Saint Côme-du-Mont, was to complete its objective of blocking possible German counterattacks from south of the Douve River and is considered part of its original airborne mission.

=== Dead Man's Corner, June 7 ===
The multi-battalion reconnaissance toward Saint Côme-du-Mont jumped off at 0430 as planned, but without the full-strength glider infantry battalion, which had not yet come up. The town was defended by a line of troops of the 3rd Battalion 1058th Grenadier Regiment (III./1058) in prepared positions from les Droueries to Basse-Addeville, who had stopped the advance of the 2/501st on D-Day. In the town itself was the 2nd Battalion of the 6th Fallschirmjäger Regiment (FJR6), which had dug in on the north and east since returning from Sainte Mère Eglise during the night. Its 1st Battalion was in Sainte Marie-du-Mont but cut off from contact with the main body. As the battle developed during the day, the commander of FJR6, Oberstleutnant Friedrich von der Heydte, brought up half of his 3rd Battalion from Carentan to reinforce the III./1058 and took over defense of the highway.

The far understrength 1st and 2nd Battalions 506th PIR spread out in skirmish line in the dark to move through the hedgerows but were subjected to persistent sniper fire. They covered the twisting dirt road from Culoville to Vierville—a distance of one mile—in four hours. Pushing on beyond the town, they had moved only a thousand yards more by 1100 when a platoon of six Sherman medium tanks of Company A, 746th Tank Battalion appeared. They moved forward another mile, with Germans constantly infiltrating in behind them, before a sniper killed the commander of the 1st Battalion 506th, Lt Col. William L. Turner. Attacks to clear the flanking hedgerows were thrown back and the advance stalled. Using a newly arrived Stuart light tank as support, Company D advanced at 1830 two miles (3 km) to the battalion objective, the crossroads below Saint Côme-du-Mont linking it with Carentan. However, the tank was destroyed there by a direct hit, where the hull and a dead crewman hanging out of the tank gave the intersection the nickname "Dead Man's Corner". Company A followed Company D to the outskirts of Saint Côme-du-Mont, but both were recalled just before midnight when no other units could consolidate on them.

During the morning, the 1st Battalion of FJR6 cut across country in an attempt to reach their own lines. They were observed by Col. Sink during the morning but not identified as enemy in time to bring them under fire. In the afternoon the German paratroopers crossed the marsh and encountered both Col. Johnson's and Capt. Shettle's pockets. After brief firefights with both at mid-afternoon, in which 90-100 were killed and a like number wounded, all but 25 of the 800-man battalion surrendered, 250 to Shettle and 350 to Johnson.

=== Round two, June 8 ===
Sink renewed the attack at 0445 with an artillery preparation on the forward German positions. He attacked on a three-battalion front, with the full-strength 1st/401st GIR on the left, the 3rd/501st in the center, and the 506th PIR on the right in column. Because of the hedgerow terrain, each battalion attacked with two companies on line, platoons in column. 1st/401st was to strike for Dead Man's Corner, 3rd/501st for the Carentan highway just below the village, and the 506th directly into Saint Côme-du-Mont. The artillery would provide a rolling barrage shifting every four minutes. In all the 65th Armored Field Artillery Battalion fired 2,500 rounds of 105 mm ammunition into the defenders of Saint Come-du-Mont in the first 90 minutes of fighting.

The 506th's battalions were so exhausted that instead of attacking through the hedgerows, they shifted to the left to follow the road from Vierville. Company D, as it had the day before, raced unopposed to Dead Man's Corner and from there up the road toward Saint Côme-du-Mont. The 1st/401st, unable to overrun German positions in front of them, attempted to flank them on its right. The effect was, that after destroying the German defenders at les Droueries who had held up the division for two days, the 3rd/501st in the center was pinched out of the attack.

The entangled units reorganized with the companies of the 506th ordered to take up a north–south defensive line in front of the village along the Vierville road. The 3rd/501st passed to the left and reached the Carentan highway by 0900. Its commander believed the garrison was withdrawing and turned south to take the causeway into Carentan, but was stopped by a strongpoint at the second bridge and by fire from 88mm guns. The 3rd/501st was then counterattacked by elements of FJR6 behind them. The battalion cleared the high ground behind Dead Man's Corner and established a strong east–west defensive line from which it repelled five strong counterattacks between 0930 and 1600.

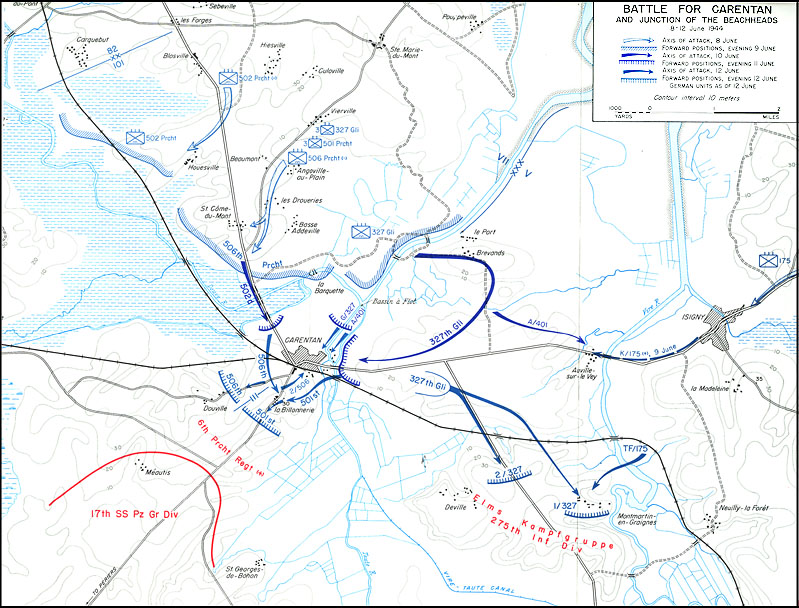
Carentan, 8–12 June 1944

The 1st/401st GIR, fighting its first action, lagged behind the paratroop units and got into a day-long battle at Basse-Addeville. At 1600 it was ordered to reverse to the west, pass through the gap between the 501st and 506th, and take the town. The 506th also sent patrols forward and both advances were unopposed. Individuals of III./1058, in heavy combat for two days, had been withdrawing without orders during the day, putting the defense in danger of collapse. As a result, Otl. von der Heydte ordered II./FJR6 to pull out to the west, cross the river, and move towards Carentan along the railroad embankment, demolishing the railroad bridge as they did. Although mop-up attacks captured the 6th's Fallschirmjäger's regimental train of 40 carts, most of the defenders escaped, blowing up the second of the four causeway bridges and a portion of the railroad embankment in the process.

== Carentan ==
On June 9 the 101st Airborne Division finished its consolidation. A slow advance off Omaha Beach concerned Allied commanders that German divisions moving towards Carentan might block the merging of the two beachheads, and VII Corps ordered the 101st Airborne Division to take Carentan. Aerial reconnaissance of Carentan indicated that the town might be lightly defended, and a plan to capture the city by a double envelopment was developed.

The attack jumped off shortly after 01:00 of June 10 and made progress encircling the city from the east, where elements of the 327th GIR also linked up with the U.S. 29th Infantry Division. An attack by the 502nd PIR across the causeway was stymied by a bridge obstacle and heavy resistance that was only overcome the next morning by a bayonet charge and hand-to-hand combat. After fruitlessly attempting to repel the Americans with counterattacks on June 11, FJR6 withdrew on the night of June 11–12, short on ammunition. Carentan was captured the morning of June 12.

The American units continued their advance to expand their hold around Carentan and establish a solid defensive line. They were counterattacked on June 13 by the 17th SS Panzergrenadier Division and nearly overrun, but were saved by the timely intervention of Combat Command A of the U.S. 2nd Armored Division. The 101st Airborne Division then went into a defensive role for the remainder of its service in Normandy.

== Casualties ==
D-Day casualties for the 101st Airborne Division were calculated in August 1944 as 1,240: 182 killed, 338 wounded, and 501 missing-presumed killed or captured. Casualties through June 30 were reported by VII Corps as 4,670: 546 killed, 2217 wounded, and 1,907 missing. The August assessment of D-Day casualties appears to reflect a significant reduction of the numbers still carried as missing on June 30.

Casualties totalling 4,500 for the German units involved are approximated by compilation. FJR6 suffered the complete loss of two battalions and the partial loss of a third, and reported 3,000 for the first seven weeks of the battle of Normandy, receiving 1,000 replacements during the campaign. The 91st Infantry Division's III./1058-Grenadier was virtually destroyed, as was its 191st Artillery Regiment, although some of its units were destroyed by elements of the U.S. 4th Division. Engagements near the beach exits between the 101st and 919. Grenadier-Regiment produced several hundred casualties.

== See also ==
- American airborne landings in Normandy
- Mission Boston
- Mission Chicago
- Harrison C. Summers
- Band of Brothers, TV miniseries
- History of the 101st Airborne Division
