= Joe E. Mann =

United States Army Medal of Honor recipient

Joe Eugene Mann
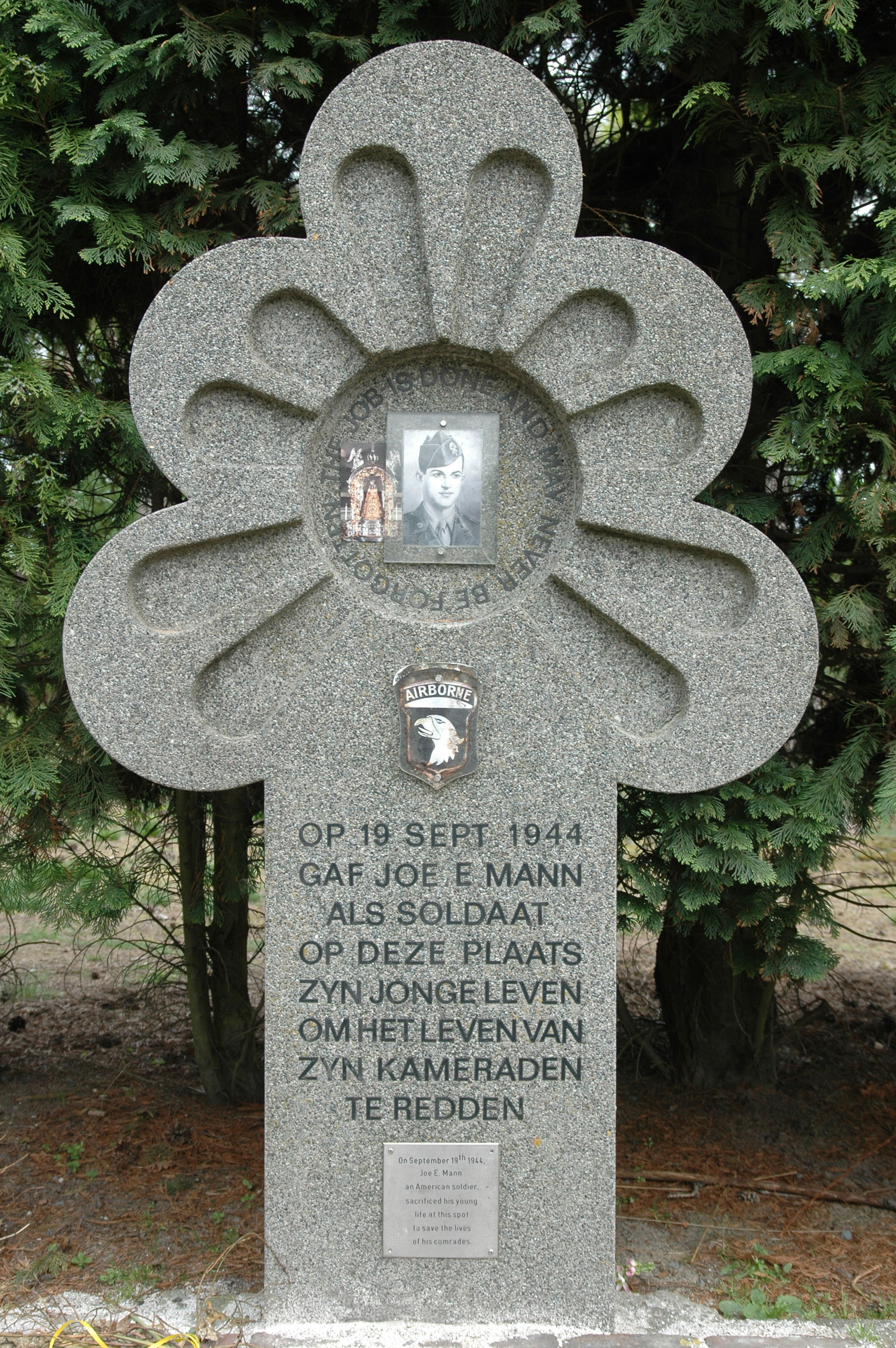
- Joe Mann monument at the place of his death. The inscription reads: "On 19 September 1944, Joe E. Mann as soldier at this place gave his young life to save the lives of his comrades."
- Born: July 8, 1922; Reardan, Washington, US
- Died: September 19, 1944 (aged 22); Best, the Netherlands
- Burial place: Greenwood Memorial Terrace, Spokane, Washington
- Military career
- Allegiance: United States
- Branch: United States Army
- Service years: 1942 - 1944
- Rank: Private First Class (Pfc.)
- Units: 502nd Parachute Infantry Regiment, 101st Airborne Division
- Conflicts: World War II
- Awards: Medal of Honor; Bronze Star; Purple Heart (5); Croix de Guerre (France)

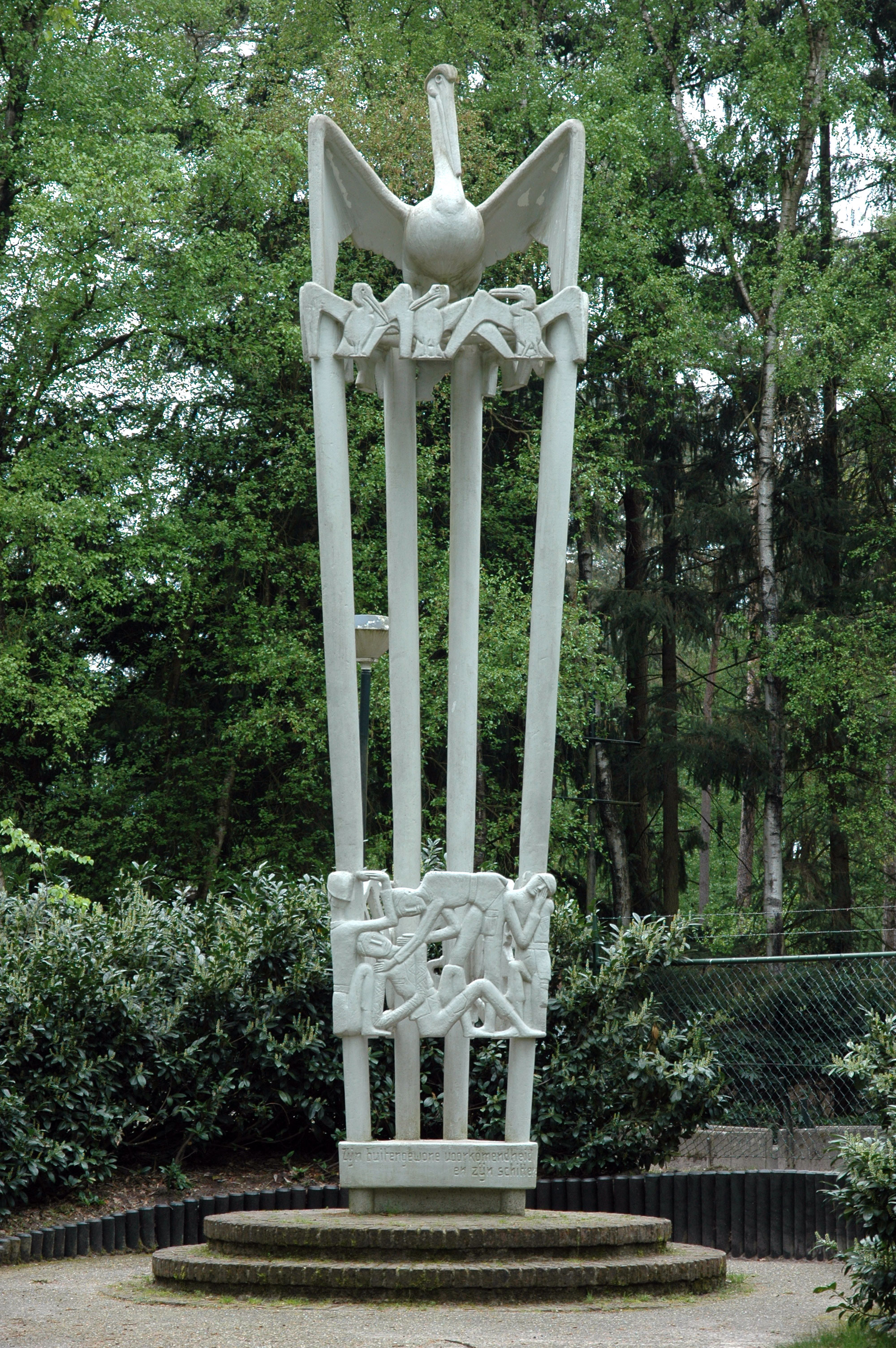
The Joe Mann war monument next to the Joe Mann theatre at the Sonseweg in Best, Netherlands.

Joe Eugene Mann (July 8, 1922 – September 19, 1944) was a United States Army soldier and a recipient of the United States military's highest decoration – the Medal of Honor – for his actions in World War II.

== Biography ==
Joe Eugene Mann was born on July 8, 1922 in rural Reardan, Washington. Joe was the fifth of nine children, and was raised on his families eastern Washington farm. He played high school football, during which he sustained a broken clavicle. Mann joined the Army from Seattle, Washington in August 1942, desiring to become a pilot in the United States Army Air Corps, although his prior clavicular injury disqualified him from this. Instead he volunteered for parachute infantry training and was assigned to the 506th Parachute Infantry Regiment and deployed to England to stage for Operation Overlord. Mann was transferred to the 502nd Parachute Infantry Regiment, and suffered a hernia during a training jump which prevented him from participating in the D-Day parachute jump on June 6, 1944. Mann recovered from his injury and participated in Operation Market Garden, assigned to Company H, 3rd Battalion, 502nd PIR, jumping into Holland on September 17. The following day, in Best, the Netherlands, he single-handedly destroyed an enemy emplacement and continued to fire on the enemy from an exposed position until being wounded. Despite his wounds, he insisted on serving guard duty during the night. The next morning, during an enemy attack, Mann smothered the blast of a hand grenade with his body, sacrificing himself to protect those around him. For these actions, he was posthumously awarded the Medal of Honor a year later, on August 30, 1945.

== Medal of Honor citation ==
Private First Class Mann's official Medal of Honor citation reads:

He distinguished himself by conspicuous gallantry above and beyond the call of duty. On 18 September 1944, in the vicinity of Best, Holland [sic], his platoon, attempting to seize the bridge across the Wilhelmina Canal, was surrounded and isolated by an enemy force greatly superior in personnel and firepower. Acting as lead scout, Pfc. Mann boldly crept to within rocket-launcher range of an enemy artillery position and, in the face of heavy enemy fire, destroyed an 88mm gun and an ammunition dump. Completely disregarding the great danger involved, he remained in his exposed position, and, with his M-1 rifle, killed the enemy one by one until he was wounded 4 times. Taken to a covered position, he insisted on returning to a forward position to stand guard during the night. On the following morning the enemy launched a concerted attack and advanced to within a few yards of the position, throwing hand grenades as they approached. One of these landed within a few feet of Pfc. Joe E. Mann. Unable to raise his arms, which were bandaged to his body, he yelled "grenade" and threw his body over the grenade, and as it exploded, died. His outstanding gallantry above and beyond the call of duty and his magnificent conduct were an everlasting inspiration to his comrades for whom he gave his life.

== Awards and decorations ==

Badge	Combat Infantryman Badge		
1st row	Medal of Honor		
2nd row	Bronze Star Medal	Purple Heart with 4 Oak leaf clusters (5 awards)	Army Good Conduct Medal
3rd row	American Campaign Medal	European–African–Middle Eastern Campaign Medal with Arrowhead device and 1 Campaign star	World War II Victory Medal
4th row	Parachutists Badge with 1 combat jump star		

Foreign Awards

Croix de Guerre

(France)

== Honored in ship naming ==
The United States Army ship USAT Private Joe E. Mann was in service from October 31, 1947, until she was transferred to the Navy on August 7, 1950.

== Memorial ==
In remembrance of Pfc. Joe E. Mann, a memorial monument was placed at the site of his death. Near the same site, in the forest between Best and Son (described sometimes as the 'Sonse forest' (Note: Zonsche is an archaic spelling of the adjective denoting the town of Son)), an open-air theater (which remains in use today) was named after him. This forest also contains a second memorial dedicated in Joe's name, the Pelican Monument, that depicts the mythical story of a pelican mother sacrificing herself to save her babies with her own flesh and blood, and an adjacent road also carries his name.

The PFC Joe E. Mann Army Reserve Center was named for him. The Reserve Center building began serving soldiers in 1957 and was operational for 40 years and 6 months. The Reserve Unit was relocated to Fairchild Airforce Base and the building was closed in 2010.

In 2022, his hometown's Reardan High School changed its name from the Indians to the Screaming Eagles, after his division.

== See also ==
- List of Medal of Honor recipients for World War II
