= John H. Michaelis =

United States Army general

John Hersey Michaelis
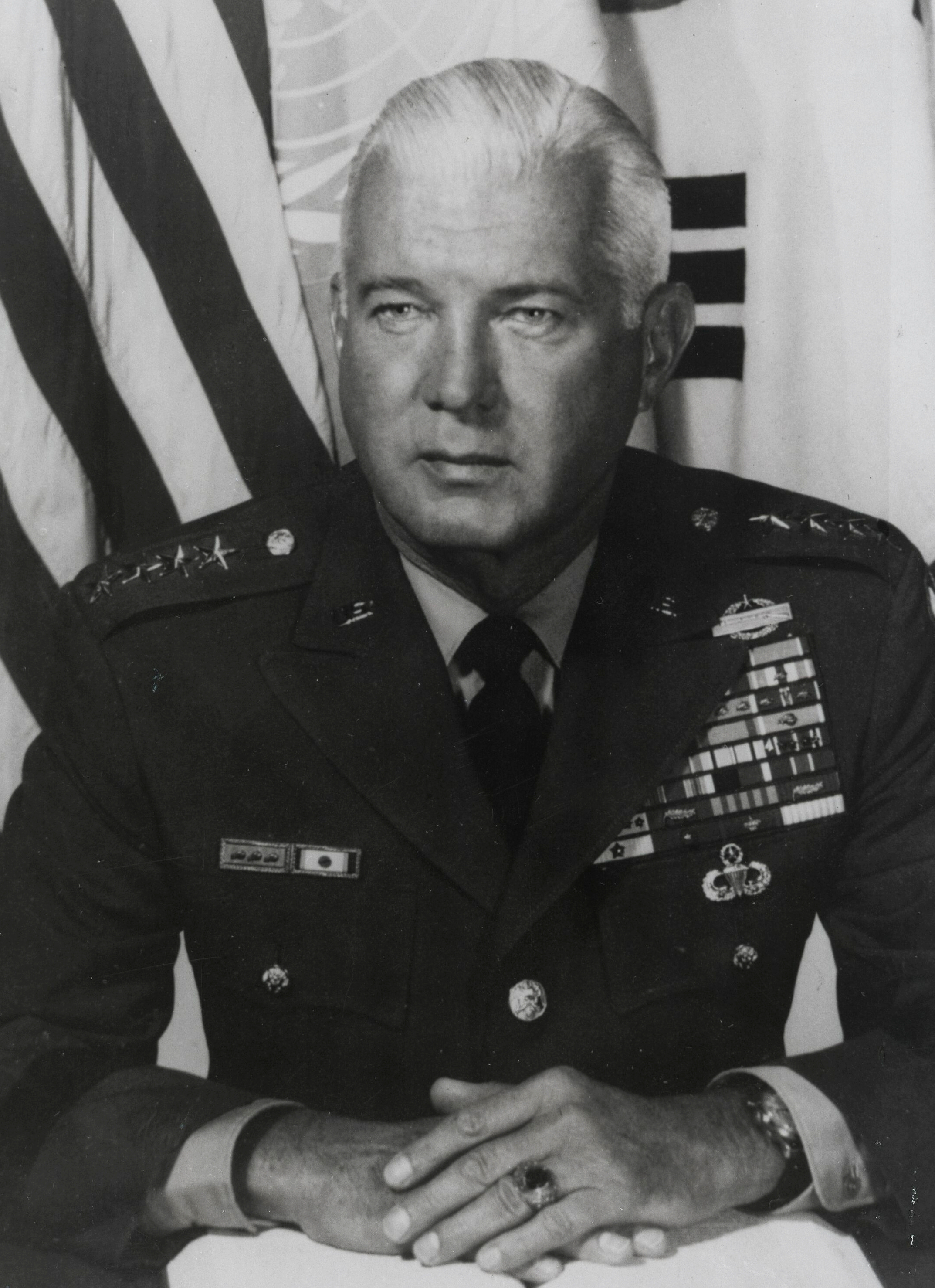
- Michaelis in 1969
- Born: 20 August 1912; Presidio of San Francisco, California, US
- Died: 31 October 1985 (aged 73); Clayton, Georgia, US
- Burial place: Arlington National Cemetery
- Military career
- Allegiance: United States
- Branch: United States Army
- Service years: 1931–1932, 1936–1972
- Rank: General
- Nicknames: Iron Mike; Colonel Mike
- Commands: United Nations Command; United States Forces Korea; Eighth United States Army; Fifth United States Army; 27th Infantry Regiment; 502nd Parachute Infantry Regiment
- Conflicts: World War II; Korean War
- Awards: Distinguished Service Cross; Distinguished Service Medal (3); Silver Star (2); Legion of Merit (4); Bronze Star Medal (3); Purple Heart (2); Air Medal

John Hersey Michaelis (20 August 1912 – 31 October 1985) was a United States Army four-star general who served as Commander in Chief, United Nations Command/Commander, United States Forces Korea/Commanding General, Eighth United States Army from 1969 to 1972.

== Military career ==
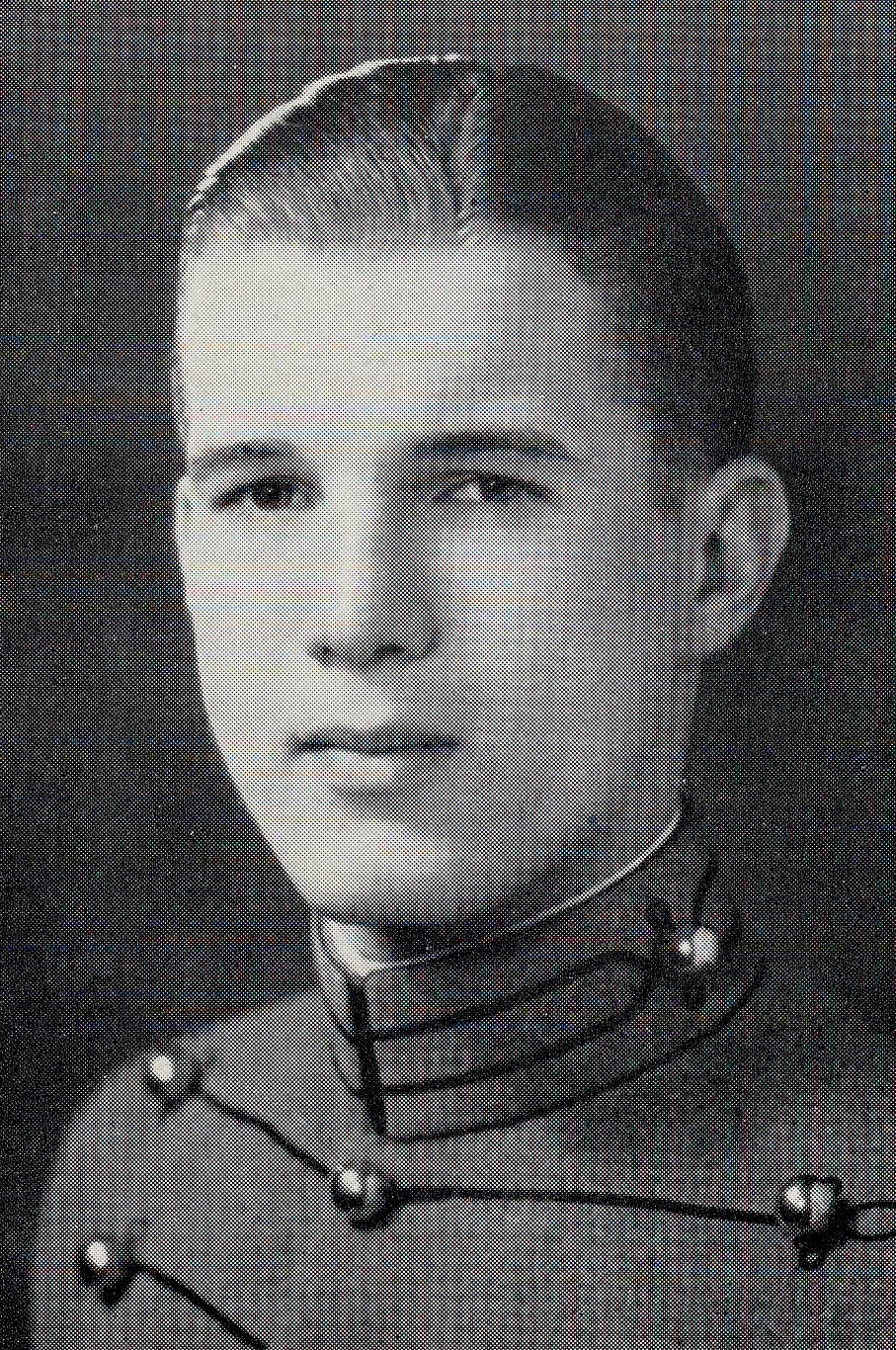
Michaelis as a West Point cadet c. 1936

Michaelis enlisted in the Army on 18 June 1931 and was subsequently appointed to the United States Military Academy. He graduated from West Point with a B.S. degree in 1936. Michaelis later graduated from the Command and General Staff School in 1942.

In World War II, Michaelis was executive officer of the 502nd Parachute Infantry Regiment, but took command of the unit after the commanding officer, George Van Horn Moseley Jr., broke his leg in the drop into Normandy. Later, Michaelis was severely wounded in the Netherlands. He served as chief of staff of the 101st Airborne Division during the Battle of Bastogne and ended the war as a colonel. Michaelis was awarded the Silver Star and two Purple Hearts.

Michaelis served as aide-de-camp to General of the Army Dwight Eisenhower from 1947 to 1948. He graduated from the Armed Forces Staff College in 1949.

During the Korean War, Michaelis commanded the 27th Infantry Regiment (the "Wolfhounds") at the Pusan perimeter, for which he received a Distinguished Service Cross. Early in the war, most American units were prone to breaking down and retreating. However his unit fared much better, General Matthew Ridgway believed, because Colonel Michaelis had been an airborne commander and therefore did not panic whenever his unit was in danger of being surrounded. For as long as his unit preserved unit integrity with interlocking fields of fire, then it could handle being surrounded and cut off as they could be resupplied from the air. It was to become an important template used by Ridgway in his conduct of the Korean War once he assumed command from General of the Army Douglas MacArthur. Ridgeway's policy was to become one of "No more retreat" and he sought to acquire many more commanders like Michaelis as the war continued. In fact, shortly after Ridgeway took command, he began to improve the Army's morale by sending the units north, starting with Michaelis's unit, under an offensive named Operation Wolfhound in their honor. Michaelis's unit began a new phase of the war that started a complete turnaround for U.N. troops. He was promoted to brigadier general in 1951.

Michaelis described the Turkish Brigade's combat readiness in unflattering terms, according to American historian Clay Blair. Blair wrote that war correspondents were misled into thinking that the Turks were "tough" fighters by their "flowing mustaches, swarthy complexions, and fierce demeanors", while in fact Blair declared them "ill trained, ill led, and green to combat." Blair quoted Michaelis as stating:

The Turks were commanded by an aged brigadier who had been a division commander at Gallipoli in 1916 fighting the British! He was highly respected, high up in the Turkish military establishment, and took a bust to brigadier to command the brigade. The average Turk soldier in the brigade came from the steppe country of Turkey, near Russia, had probably had only three or four years of school, was uprooted, moved to western Turkey, given a uniform, [a] rifle, and a little smattering of training, stuck on a ship, sailed ten thousand miles, then dumped off on a peninsula – 'Korea, where's that?' – and told the enemy was up there someplace, go get him! The Turk soldier scratches his head and says, 'What's he done to me?'

Michaelis was also awarded a second Silver Star and the Air Medal. In 1952, he returned to the United States and became commandant of cadets at the United States Military Academy. Later Michaelis commanded the Fifth Army. He was promoted to full general upon his retirement in 1972.
