= Frank R. Fratellenico =

United States Army Medal of Honor recipient (1951–1970)

Frank Rocco Fratellenico
- Born: July 14, 1951; Sharon, Connecticut, US
- Died: August 19, 1970 (aged 19); Quang Tri Province, Republic of Vietnam
- Burial place: remains were cremated and taken to Thailand
- Military career
- Allegiance: United States
- Branch: United States Army
- Service years: 1969–1970
- Rank: Corporal
- Nickname: "Rocko"
- Units: Company B, 2d Battalion, 502nd Infantry Regiment, 1st Brigade, 101st Airborne Division
- Conflicts: Vietnam War †
- Awards: Medal of Honor; Purple Heart

Frank Rocco Fratellenico (July 14, 1951 – August 19, 1970) was a United States Army soldier and a recipient of the United States military's highest decoration—the Medal of Honor—for his actions in the Vietnam War.

== Biography ==
Fratellenico joined the Army from Albany, New York in 1969, and by August 19, 1970, was serving as a corporal in Company B, 2d Battalion, 502nd Infantry Regiment, 1st Brigade, 101st Airborne Division. During a firefight on that day, in Quang Tri Province, Republic of Vietnam, Fratellenico was about to throw a hand grenade when he was wounded, causing him to drop the activated device. He then smothered the grenade with his body, sacrificing his life to protect his fellow soldiers from the blast.

While he was originally buried, his remains were exhumed in 1997 and cremated, after which his ashes were taken to Thailand.

== Medal of Honor citation ==
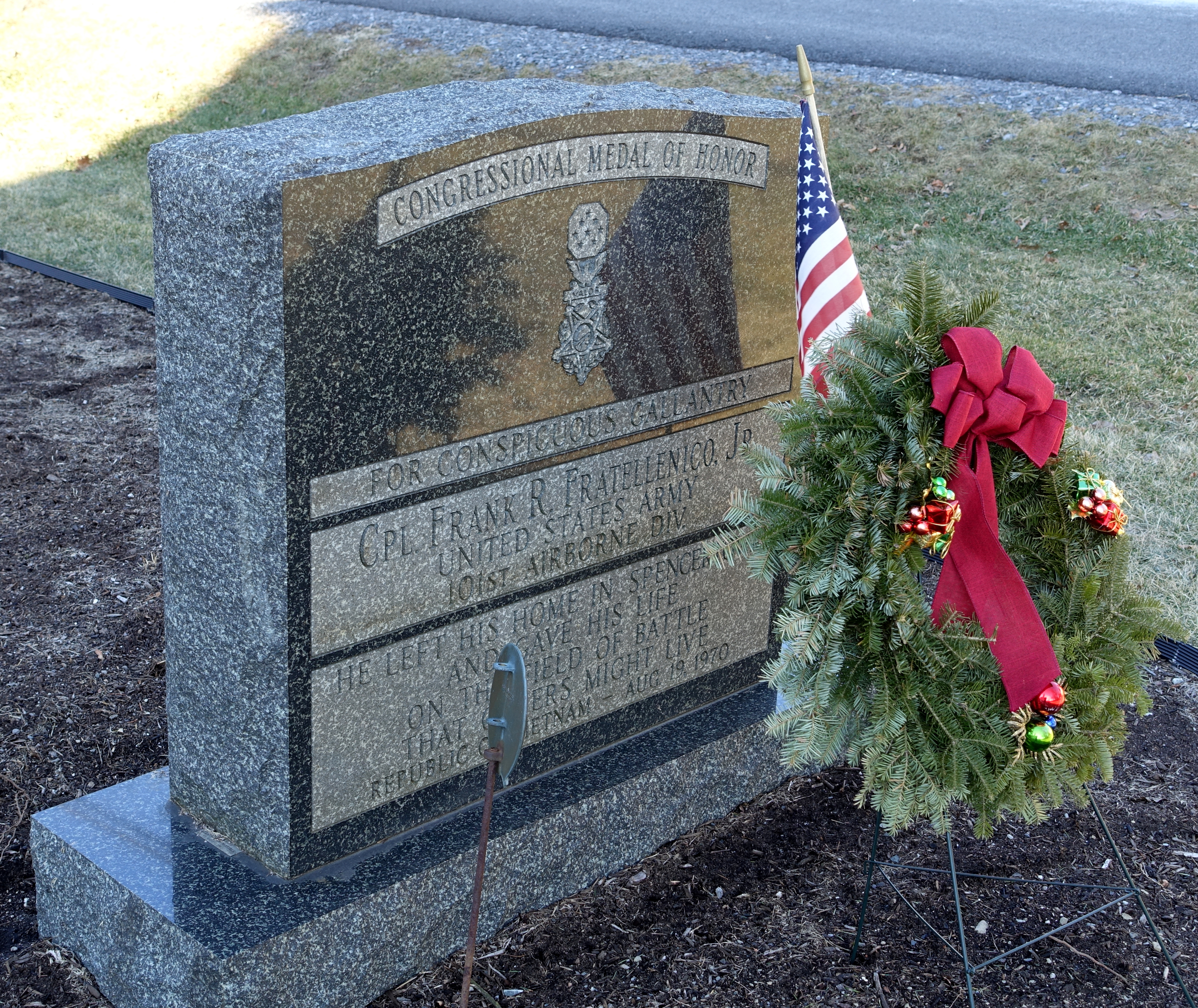
Memorial at Austerlitz, New York

Corporal Fratellenico's official Medal of Honor citation reads:

Cpl. Fratellenico distinguished himself while serving as a rifleman with Company B. Cpl. Fratellenico's squad was pinned down by intensive fire from 2 well-fortified enemy bunkers. At great personal risk Cpl. Fratellenico maneuvered forward and, using hand grenades, neutralized the first bunker which was occupied by a number of enemy soldiers. While attacking the second bunker, enemy fire struck Cpl. Fratellenico, causing him to fall to the ground and drop a grenade which he was preparing to throw. Alert to the imminent danger to his comrades, Cpl. Fratellenico retrieved the grenade and fell upon it an instant before it exploded. His heroic actions prevented death or serious injury to 4 of his comrades nearby and inspired his unit which subsequently overran the enemy position. Cpl. Fratellenico's conspicuous gallantry, extraordinary heroism, and intrepidity at the cost of his life, above and beyond the call of duty, are in keeping with the highest traditions of the military service and reflect great credit on him, his unit, and the U.S. Army.

== See also ==
- List of Medal of Honor recipients for the Vietnam War
