= USNS Private Joe E. Mann =

Cargo ship of the United States Navy

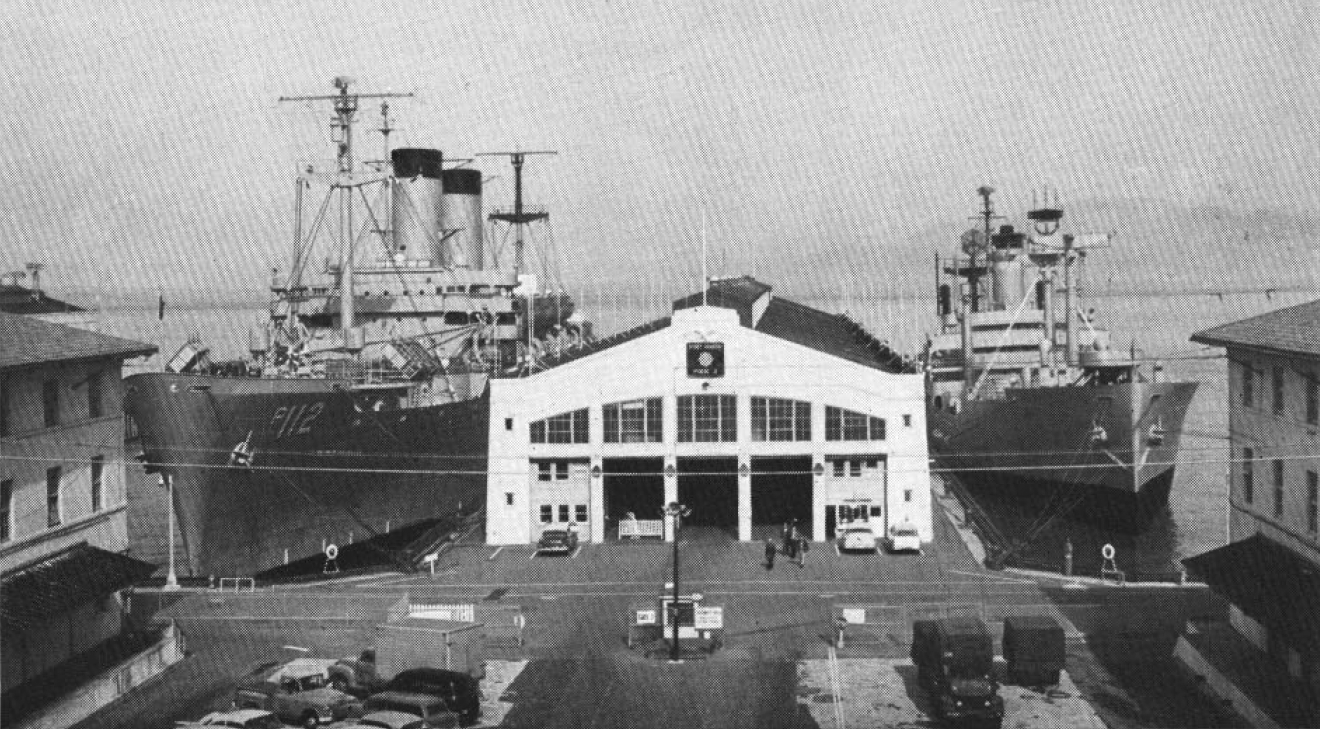
- USNS Pvt. J.E. Mann (T-AK-253), right, circa 1960

History

United States
- Name: Owensboro Victory; Private Joe E. Mann; Richfield
- Namesake: Owensboro, Kentucky; Joe E. Mann, awarded the Medal of Honor; Richfield, Utah
- Ordered: as type (VC2-S-AP3) hull, MCV hull 719
- Builder: Permanente Metals Corporation, Richmond, California
- Laid down: 12 June 1945
- Launched: 21 July 1945
- Sponsored by: Mrs. Robert A. Nieman
- Completed: 27 August 1945
- Commissioned: 30 August 1946, as USAT Private Joe E. Mann
- In service: 7 August 1950, as USNS Private Joe. E Mann (T-AK-253);
- Out of service: 21 November 1968
- Reclassified: 27 November 1960, as USNS Richfield (T-AGM-4)
- Stricken: date unknown
- Identification: Hull symbol: T-AK-253; Hull symbol:T-AGM-4
- Fate: Sold for scrapping, 16 March 1976

General characteristics
- Class & type: Boulder Victory-class cargo ship (1945-1960); Longview-class missile range instrumentation ship (1960-)
- Displacement: 4,480 long tons (4,550 t) (standard); 15,580 long tons (15,830 t) (full load)
- Length: 455 ft (139 m)
- Beam: 62 ft (19 m)
- Draft: 29 ft 2 in (8.89 m)
- Installed power: 8,500 shp (6,300 kW)
- Propulsion: 1 × steam turbine; 2 × header-type boilers, 525psi 750°; 1 × shaft
- Speed: 15.5 kn (17.8 mph; 28.7 km/h)
- Complement: 99 officers and enlisted
- Armament: none

USNS Private Joe E. Mann (T-AK-253) was a Boulder Victory-class cargo ship acquired in 1950, from the U.S. Army, where she was known as the USAT Private Joe E. Mann.

In 1960, the Navy converted the ship to a Longview-class missile range instrumentation ship and renamed her USNS Richfield (T-AGM-4). Richfield served on the Pacific Missile Range, based out of California, and was placed out of service in 1968.

== Victory ship constructed in California ==
Private Joe E. Mann (AK–253) was laid down, under U.S. Maritime Commission contract, as Owensboro Victory (MCV hull 719) by the Permanente Metals Corporation, Yard #2, Richmond, California, 12 June 1945; launched 21 July 1945; sponsored by Mrs. Robert A. Nieman; and delivered to the Maritime Commission, thence to Coastwise Lines for operation, 27 August 1945.

== Post-World War II commercial service ==
A month and a half after delivery, Owensboro Victory departed San Francisco, California, carrying cargo and passengers to occupied Japan. In December, she sailed for the United States, via the Suez Canal, and arrived in Boston, Massachusetts, 7 February 1946.

Shifting to New York City, the following month, she made cargo runs to European ports until returned to the U.S. Maritime Commission in September, for transfer to the Army Transportation Service.

== U.S. Army service ==
Renamed USAT Private Joe E. Mann, 31 October 1947, she served the Army until she was again returned to the Maritime Commission and simultaneously transferred to the Navy, 7 August 1950.

== U.S. Navy service ==
Designated T-AK–253, the Victory ship was crewed by the civil service and operated under Military Sea Transportation Service (MSTS) as a cargo ship until October 1958.

== Conversion to a missile tracking ship ==
Then fitted out as a missile range instrumentation ship, she was reassigned by MSTS to the Pacific Missile Range. Private Joe E. Mann served as a telemetry ship for the early Corona surveillance satellite missions (as early as Discoverer 8, November 1959) through the flight of Discoverer 13 (August 1960). Renamed and reclassified USNS Richfield (AGM–4) on 27 November 1960, she operated off the California coast, in cooperation with the U.S. Air Force.

Two other ships were reconfigured in to this new class, Longview-class missile range instrumentation ship, Dalton Victory and Longview.

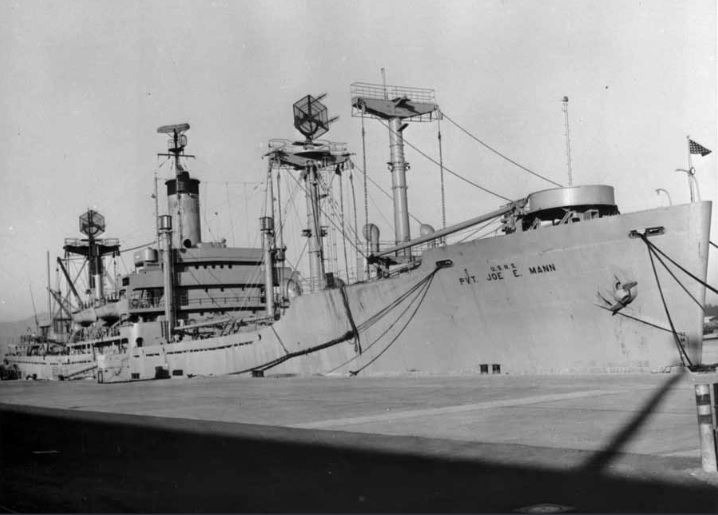
USNS PVT Joe E. Mann in 1960, supporting the Discoverer program.

== Final inactivation ==
Richfield continued her missile tracking until transferred to the Maritime Administration, 21 November 1968, when she was berthed with the National Defense Reserve Fleet at Suisun Bay, Benicia, California.

She was sold for scrapping, 16 March 1976, to Nicolai Joffe, and then withdrawn from the Reserve Fleet and delivered to Nicolai Joffe, 12 April 1976.

== See also ==
- Missile Range Instrumentation Ship
