= 502nd Infantry Regiment =

Infantry regiment of the United States Army

502nd Parachute Infantry Regiment (502nd PIR) 502nd Airborne Infantry Regiment (502nd AIR) 502nd Infantry Regiment (502nd IR)
- Coat of arms
- Active: 1942–1945, 1957–present
- Country: United States
- Branch: United States Army
- Type: Airborne forces
- Role: Parachute infantry and air assault
- Size: Regiment
- Part of: 101st Airborne Division
- Garrison/HQ: Fort Campbell
- Nicknames: "Five-Oh-Deuce", "The Deuce"
- Mottos: Strike, I fight where I am told, and win where I fight.
- Engagements: World War II; Operation Overlord; Operation Market Garden; Battle of The Bulge; Invasion of Germany; Vietnam War; Operation Hawthorne; Battle of Dak To; Persian Gulf War; Iraq War; War in Afghanistan; Operation Dragon Strike; Operation Inherent Resolve
- Decorations: Presidential Unit Citation (4x); Valorous Unit Award (4x); Meritorious Unit Commendation; French Croix de Guerre (World War II); Vietnam Gallantry Cross (3x); Vietnam Civil Actions Medal

Commanders
- Current commander: COL Duke W. Reim
- Notable commanders: George Van Horn Moseley Jr. Colin Powell; John H. Michaelis; Steve A. Chappuis

Insignia
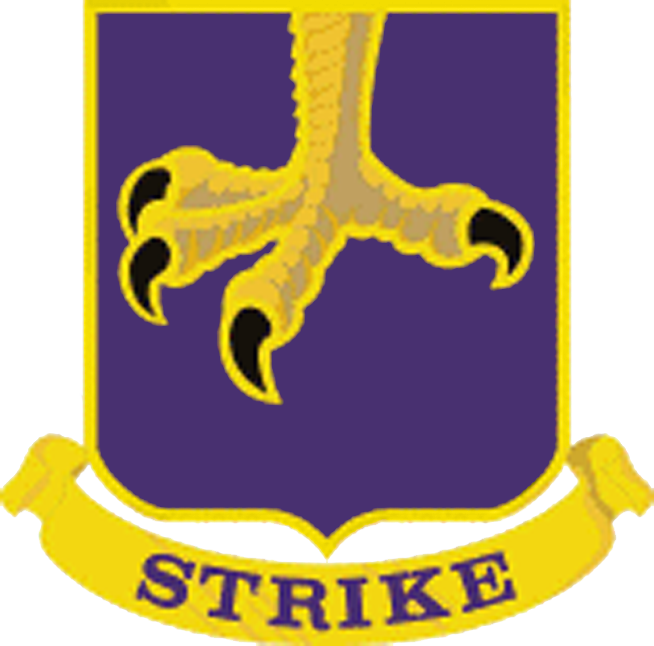
- Distinctive unit insignia

- Airborne background trimming for 1st and 2nd Battalions, worn behind the Air Assault Badge

- Beret flashes for 1st and 2nd Battalions, worn on the Army black beret

The 502nd Infantry Regiment (502nd IR), previously titled the 502nd Parachute Infantry Regiment (502nd PIR), is an infantry regiment of the United States Army. The regiment was established shortly after U.S. entry into World War II, and was assigned as a regiment of the 101st Airborne Division, "The Screaming Eagles", one of the most decorated formations of the U.S. Army. The regiment saw substantial action in the European Theater of World War II and was inactivated in 1945, shortly after the end of the war. Reactivating in a new form in 1956, the 502nd Infantry has served in the Vietnam War, the Persian Gulf War, Iraq War, War in Afghanistan, and Operation Inherent Resolve in Iraq. Since 1974, the regiment has been classified as an Air Assault unit.

Currently, 1st Battalion & 2nd Battalion are active, both assigned to the 2nd Brigade Combat Team, 101st Airborne Division (Air Assault).

== History ==
=== World War II ===
The original 48-man Parachute Test Platoon was formed at Fort Benning, Georgia. Four parachute infantry battalions were planned to follow.

On 1 July 1941, the 502d Parachute Infantry Battalion was activated at Fort Benning under the command of Major George P. Howell, under orders dated 15 April. Howell had served as executive officer of the 501st PIB (not to be confused with the later 501st Parachute Infantry Regiment). Initially composed of two skeleton companies sliced off from the 501st, the 502d lacked much, from parachutes to small arms. This kept the battalion understrength until more men could be recruited at Fort Jackson, South Carolina, and Fort Bragg, North Carolina. Activation of the next two battalions, the 503d and 504th, was put on hold until October 1941 because there were no more men or equipment on hand at Benning.

The Japanese attack on Pearl Harbor on 7 December 1941 and the German declaration of war on the United States four days later accelerated every kind of military planning. On 30 January 1942, realizing a battalion was too small to conduct offensive operations and survive to fight again, the War Department hurriedly authorized the activation of four Army parachute regiments. On 24 February 1942, each of the three companies of the 502d was consolidated with a company in the 1st Battalion of the new regiment, which bore the same numerical designation. The 502d PIR, less the 1st Battalion, was officially activated on 2 March 1942; Howell was promoted to colonel and appointed commander, but left that same month to command Benning's parachute school. He passed command to his executive officer, Lieutenant Colonel George Van Horn Moseley Jr., who would command for the next two years.

In August 1942, following the activation of the 101st Airborne Division at Camp Claiborne, Louisiana, the 502nd PIR moved from Fort Benning to join the rest of the division at Fort Bragg. The integration of a selected parachute unit into a partly draftee division that for the most part was not jump-qualified led to problems, some of which could only be solved through training. Throughout the rest of 1942 and into 1943, the 502nd took part in the 101st's grueling training program, which consisted of individual, unit, and combined division training. In March 1943, the 502nd took part in a series of wargames across the Carolinas; later that year, it exercised across Tennessee.

On 4 September 1943, men of the 502nd boarded the SS Strathnaver bound for their new home in England. After breakdowns and saltwater contamination of the ship's drinking water, the regiment was stuck in St. John's, Newfoundland. On 4 October the SS John Ericsson picked them up, and they arrived in Liverpool on 18 October. They settled into quarters in the small villages of Chilton Foliat and Denford in Berkshire, England, which would be their home for the next seven months. The Regiment's troopers continued their rigorous training which included 15–25 miles (24–40 km) hikes and daily close-combat exercises. Instructions were given on a wide variety of topics, including first aid, map reading, chemical warfare, and demolitions. Other training was held on the use of German weapons, since enemy dead were considered a source of emergency resupply. Company- and battalion-sized parachute drops were rehearsed heavily. The largest of these rehearsals was Exercise Eagle, a division combat drop in May. It didn't go well; H Company dropped 9 miles (14 km) short of the objective, while high winds and rough landings injured over 400 paratroopers across the division, many of whom were then not available for the Normandy jump three weeks later.

==== Normandy ====
Flying out of RAF Membury and RAF Greenham Common in the first wave to depart, the 502nd PIR headed for Drop Zone (DZ) A. The unit's mission was to secure two northern causeways leading inland from Utah Beach and destroy a German battery of 122 mm howitzers near Saint-Martin-de-Varreville. Captain Frank Lillyman, officer in charge of the regiment's pathfinder platoon, was the first American jumper of the night – celebrated as the first American paratrooper to drop behind German lines in the Allied invasion of Normandy. He hit the ground at 00:15 on the 6th, his habitual jump cigar clenched in his teeth. The pathfinders soon learned they'd been misdropped, so they made no effort to get the rest of the regiment lost with them and left their radios and beacons turned off. Coming in unguided, the formations of C-47s broke up in a combination of low clouds and heavy enemy anti-aircraft fire. Some planeloads, including two sticks of A Company, were dropped over the English Channel and drowned. Consequently, most of Colonel Moseley's troops landed way off their designated DZs, up to 5 miles (8.0 km) away. Colonel Moseley badly broke his leg and had to relinquish command to his executive officer, LTC John H. "Iron Mike" Michaelis.

1st Battalion, under LTC Patrick F. Cassidy, was the only battalion of the entire 101st to come down on target, and that through blind luck. 1st Battalion secured Saint Martin-de-Varreville by 06:30, sent a patrol under SSG Harrison C. Summers to seize a German barracks at Mésières, "WXYZ" objective and set up a thin line of defense from Foucarville to Beuzeville. 2nd Battalion, under LTC Steve Chappuis, moved inland from its drop zones. Meanwhile, the 3rd Battalion led by LTC Robert G. Cole was responsible for securing the two causeways coming inland from Utah Beach. Undaunted by the confusion, LTC Cole gradually collected whatever men he could find both from his unit and anyone else's (at one point including 1LT Dick Winters of E/506th). Cole eventually achieved his objective in time to secure the beach landing of the 4th Infantry Division.

LTC Cole was in the lead five days later as the 502nd was part of the division's effort to capture the town of Carentan. Moving the 3rd Battalion down the causeway toward the Ingouf farm under heavy German fire, LTC Cole ordered a bayonet charge. Capturing the objective, LTC Cole was nominated for the Medal of Honor. His executive officer, Major John Stopka, was nominated for the Distinguished Service Cross. On 29 June the 101st was relieved from VIII Corps and sent to Cherbourg Naval Base to relieve the 4th Infantry Division elements who had the German garrison pinned down in that seaport city. The 502nd returned to England shortly thereafter for refitting, earning a Presidential Unit Citation for the campaign.

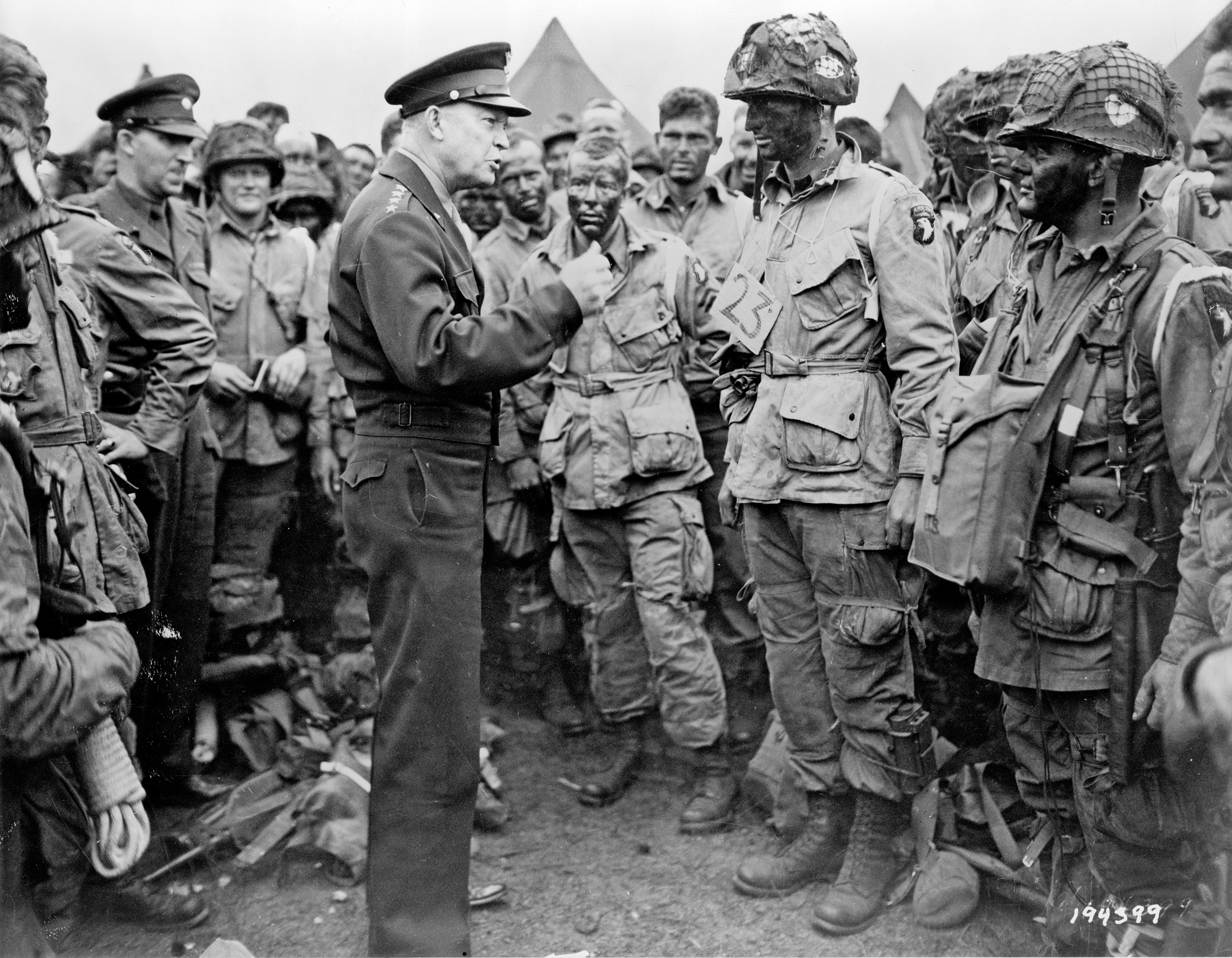
Gen. Eisenhower speaks with 1st Lt. Wallace C. Strobel and men of Company E of the 502nd Parachute Infantry Regiment, 101st Airborne Division on the evening of 5 June 1944. The placard around Strobel's neck indicates he is the jumpmaster for chalk 23 of the 438th TCG. The taller soldier to Strobel's right with the dark hair is Ray "Hoss" Fuller of Nashville, TN.

The summer of refitting was punctuated by several planned combat jumps to capture objectives in front of the advancing Allied ground forces, yet every jump was cancelled as the tanks got there first.

==== Operation Market Garden ====
Operation Market Garden was a British plan that would be the first major daylight jump attempted since the German invasion of Crete four years before. Set for 17 September 1944, the airborne troops were to seize roads, bridges and the key communication cities of Eindhoven, Nijmegen and Arnhem, thus cutting the Netherlands in half and clearing a corridor for British armored and motorized columns all the way to the German border.

The 101st mission was to secure the 15 miles (24 km) of highway stretching from Eindhoven north to Veghel. Under the command of Colonel Michaelis, the unit was to land in the Netherlands on DZ C, seize the small highway bridge over the Dommel river north of St. Oedenrode and the railroad and road bridges over the Wilhelmina Canal at Best. The 502nd was also given the mission of guarding DZs B & C for the subsequent glider landings. Shortly after 13:15 on the afternoon of 17 September 1944, after an uneventful daylight drop, the men of the 502nd gathered up and headed for their objectives. 1st Battalion went north to capture the little town of Sint-Oedenrode. 2nd Battalion secured the glider LZ. 3rd Battalion sent patrols through the Zonsche forest, trying to move toward the town of Best and the bridge. German resistance was tough in the vicinity of Best, but the 3rd Battalion spearheaded by Captain Robert Jones' H Company fought their way to within 100 yards (91 m) of the bridge before the Germans blew it up. In fierce fighting around the bridge, Private first class Joe E. Mann, already hit twice, was killed when he threw himself on a German grenade to save the other soldiers in his foxhole. That same day, LTC Cole was shot and killed elsewhere in the Zonsche Forest. Cole died before formally receiving his Medal of Honor for the Carentan charge, while Private Mann would receive it posthumously. They were the only two members of the 101st to earn the nation's highest honor during World War II.

On 26 September, a German artillery shell hit a tree by the 502nd's Regimental CP. LTC Michaelis, 1st Battalion's LTC Cassidy, the regimental S2 and S3, the division G2 and G3, and the commander of the supporting 377th Artillery Battalion were all hit. Without a regimental XO, and with Cassidy and Cole both down, 2nd Battalion commander Steve Chappuis took command of the regiment. After securing their hard-won objectives, the men of the 502nd moved north with the rest of the 101st to take hold of defensive positions on 'The Island', southwest of Arnhem. It was here that the 101st would fight some of its toughest battles during its time in the Netherlands. Eventually they were withdrawn to Camp Mourmelon, France for rest and refit.

==== Battle of the Bulge ====
Just after dawn on 16 December 1944, the Germans launched a major offensive west through the Ardennes Forest. Their goal was the port city of Antwerp where they hoped to choke off the Allied supply lines. Almost the only American theater reserve were the two refitting airborne divisions. The 101st was ordered to the vitally important town of Bastogne, Belgium, the central road junction in the Ardennes. The 101st was jammed into trucks for an overnight rush to Bastogne on 18 December. They were soon surrounded along with elements of several armored and artillery outfits. The 502nd held positions on the north and northwest portion of the surrounded city. In an attack that took place on Christmas morning in the village of Hemroulle, numerous German tanks penetrated the line. Simultaneously farther north strong German infantry elements infiltrated the town of Champs. Two of the German tanks which drove north from Hemroulle attempted to bypass the regimental CP at the Rolle Chateau, only to be tracked down by bazooka and grenade-toting paratroops. Finally, on 26 December, the 4th Armored Division of Patton's Third Army broke through the encirclement to reinforce the defense.

On 14 January 1945, the 3rd Battalion lost another commander. LTC John Stopka and some of his troopers were advancing through the forest near Michamps, Belgium, along an elevated rail line when enemy tanks began advancing along the other side. Someone called in for air support and the planes strafed too close to the friendly positions, killing Stopka and 30 other paratroopers. Command of the 3rd Battalion was given to Major Cecil L. Simmons.

The 101st Airborne held a line along the Moder River for over a month as part of the Seventh Army. On 23 February, the 101st were relieved and returned to Mourmelon, France. They began a refit period while the leadership began planning for potential combat jumps in and around Berlin to end the war. There was also a ceremony in which General Eisenhower awarded the entire division the Presidential Unit Citation for gallantry in action during the fighting for Bastogne. This was the first time an entire division had been so honored. This was added to the one awarded to the 502nd for Normandy.

As the war in Europe was nearing its end, the 502nd moved to the Ruhr Pocket on 2 April to help in mop-up operations. Here the 502nd went on the line facing the Rhine River south of Düsseldorf. On 4 and 5 May, the 502nd followed the 506th into the securing of Hitler's private residence in the town of Berchtesgaden, home to many high-ranking Nazi Party officials and German military officers.

The 502nd spent the summer of 1945 on occupation duty near Mittersill, Austria. Returning to France in September, the soldiers continued waiting for transport to the U.S. for the promised victory parade down New York's Fifth Avenue. However the reduced peacetime Army only had room for one of the European Theater's four airborne divisions, and the 82nd was senior in terms of combat experience. The 101st Airborne Division was inactivated 30 November 1945 at Auxerre, France. Much of the unit property and records were burned, only nine boxes of the 502d's records making it to the States for eventual inclusion in the National Archives. For comparison, the 506th sent sixteen boxes.

=== Post-World War II ===
While on inactive status, the regiment was redesignated on 18 June 1948 as the 502d Airborne Infantry Regiment and allotted to the Regular Army on 25 June that same year. It was activated on 6 July 1948 at Camp Breckinridge, Kentucky, as a training unit that was airborne in name only. It was inactivated on 1 April 1949. Shortly after the outbreak of the Korean War, it was again activated on 25 August 1950, again as a training unit at Camp Breckinridge, and then inactivated on 1 December 1953 at Camp Breckinridge following the truce declared in July. It was activated yet again as a training unit on 15 May 1954 at Fort Jackson, South Carolina.

On 21 September 1956, the Army established the 101st again as a training unit by transferring its colors, then at a training command at Fort Jackson, SC, to Fort Campbell, KY. The departure of the 11th Airborne Division for NATO duty in West Germany meant that the Army needed another rapidly deployable unit to face Cold War contingencies. The reactivated 101st was formed using the assets of the 187th and 508th Airborne RCTs, plus volunteers from the inactivating 6th Infantry Division run through parachute school either at Fort Campbell or Fort Benning.

The division of 1956 was much different from the wartime pattern. There were tight military budgets for conventional forces in the Nuclear Age since the predominant belief was that battlefield nuclear weapons would be used early and often. This in turn made riflemen obsolete. This, combined with the fact the new 101st would be built from scratch, made the division a test of what was called a Pentomic, for "pentagonal atomic" division. The division was made up of five "battle groups", each one consisting of five companies (1 headquarters company, four rifle companies) plus a heavy mortar section. There was even a nuclear-armed rocket battery in Division Artillery. But there was only room for one "battle group" of each of the 101st's old regiments (327th, 501st, 502nd, and 506th, with the 187th coming in from the 11th). The lineage of the 502d was revived with the activation on 25 April 1957 of HHC, 1st Airborne Battle Group, 502d Infantry (bearing a lineage going back to Company A of the original 502nd PIB) as a unit within the 101st. As the rest of the Army converted to the Pentomic structure, the 2d Airborne Battle Group, 502nd Infantry was activated on 1 March 1957 in West Germany by reflagging existing elements of the 11th Airborne Division. The 502d Infantry became the 502d Airborne Battle Group at Fort Campbell, KY, headed by Col. Nemethy and Sgt. Major Dido from 1961-64. The 502d was flown to Oxford, Mississippi to help integrate Ole Miss, under orders from President John F. Kennedy. It was also flown to Florida during the Cuban Missile Crisis, and was on C-130 aircraft ready to jump into Cuba when the crisis ended.

By 1964, the Army had reached the conclusion that the Pentomic arrangement didn't work, and the 101st returned to a more recognizable structure. The Department of the Army announced that brigades would be the building blocks of the new style divisions. Consisting of three battalions with wartime attachments, they were similar to what used to be called a regiment or regimental combat team; however, the 502d found itself split. The HHC 2d Battalion (with the lineage of Co B/502PIR) was in 1st Brigade with two battalions of the 327th, and HHC 1st Battalion (with the lineage of Co A/502PIR) was in 2d Brigade with two battalions of the 501st.

=== Vietnam War ===
In April 1965 the 1st Brigade was deployed to South Vietnam to relieve the 173rd Airborne Brigade. Instead as the war expanded, both units stayed. The 2d Battalion, 502d Infantry quickly made a name for itself under the command of LTC Henry E. Emerson.

In June 1966 during Operation Hawthorne, Company C, 2d Battalion, 502d Infantry was conducting a mission to locate elements of the North Vietnamese People's Army of Vietnam (PAVN) 24th Regiment. Charlie Company made contact with what was estimated to be a battalion-sized enemy element. Under heavy enemy fire and unable to maneuver in any direction, CPT Bill Carpenter called for air strikes on top of his position in an attempt to force the enemy to withdraw. "We might as well take some of them with us", he radioed to the 2nd Battalion command post. The Napalm attack injured seven of Carpenter's men, but the PAVN ceased fire long enough to allow Company C to consolidate, reorganize and establish a position from which to defend and begin evacuation of wounded personnel. For their extraordinary heroism in destroying the PAVN and in evacuating the mass casualties, both Carpenter and 1st SGT Walter Sabalauski received the Distinguished Service Cross. The Fort Campbell Air Assault School was named in Sabalauski's honor. Another member of 2-502d was CPT Tommy Taylor, son of General Maxwell Taylor, who wanted to serve with his father's wartime command. James Earnest “JE” Shuyler PFC, HHC Medic, was posthumously awarded the Silver Star for his extraordinary heroism in close combat against the numerically superior hostile forces.

In 1967, Operation Eagle Thrust moved the rest of the division to South Vietnam aboard chartered airliners as part of the American buildup. At that time it was the largest single airlift in US military history. Unfortunately the orders for it found the remainder of the division on Fort Campbell not ready to enter the fight. It was a skeletal formation that had been drained of personnel to support the war effort. To bring it up to full strength prior to deployment, it was necessary to fill it with non-airborne-qualified personnel from other units in the Third Army area. The division effectively ceased being an airborne unit, although the official transformation to the 101st Airborne Division (Airmobile) did not take place until mid-1968.

The 2d Battalion served almost seven years in South Vietnam. Fighting scattered actions under two different brigade headquarters from the Mekong River delta in the south to the Vietnamese Demilitarized Zone up north, they earned 27 campaign streamers, six American and eight Vietnamese unit citations between them, including two Presidential Unit Citations earned by 2nd Battalion for An Khe and Dak To. The 1st Battalion fought in the A Shau Valley. Three 2d Battalion soldiers earned the Medal of Honor. Specialist Dale E. Wayrynen, Private First Class Milton A. Lee and Corporal Frank R. Fratellenico all have Fort Campbell landmarks named for them. In December 1971, after having drawn down in country, the 101st began returning home to Fort Campbell.

=== Post-Vietnam War ===
In order to move home in a more convenient fashion, the 101st largely drew down in South Vietnam, and it was a skeletal unit that came back. On 10 February 1972, the 1st Battalion, 502d Infantry returned to Fort Campbell with one officer, one warrant officer, and ten enlisted men, down from its wartime fill of nearly nine hundred officers and men. Most serviceable equipment had been left behind for the South Vietnamese military.

The division was officially welcomed home on 6 April 1972, and began the task of rebuilding itself. Division commander Major General John Cushman, a former 2d Brigade commander, stated with the end of the Vietnam War and of the draft, that the 101st was to be reconfigured as a combat-ready, all-volunteer force by May 1973.

If the 502d was going to rebuild, it would need to get out and train. In opportunistic fashion, much of that training came from other units' funding. In the summer of 1972, 1-502 departed to West Point, New York to support summer field training at the United States Military Academy. The next two summers found it New York bound again, supporting the Army Reserve's 187th Infantry Brigade (Separate).

This is not to say all was well on Fort Campbell in those years. There were equipment shortages, racial tensions, drug use, and drunken brawls. But the units built and grew. In 1980 1-502 formed the centerpiece of "Task Force Strike" and deployed to Egypt for Operation Operation BRIGHT STAR. This was a joint training exercise with Egyptian forces, culminating in a desert live fire exercise supported by low-level B-52 Stratofortress strikes; these aircraft having flown a long-duration mission from the continental US. Task Force Strike was the first American ground force in the region since World War II.

In February 1982, Task Force 1-502 deployed to Panama support of Operation "Kindle Liberty", intended to demonstrate U.S. ability and resolve to defend the Panama Canal in the light of spreading pro-Soviet/Cuban influence in Nicaragua and Central America. The task force deployed on C-5 Galaxy aircraft, 24 flights being enough to move 1-502 Infantry, a battery of 105 mm howitzers, a platoon of engineers, and an aviation package of UH-60 Black Hawk transport helicopters and AH-1S Cobra gunships to Howard Air Force Base in Panama. This marked the first deployment of the UH-60 helicopter to Panama.

Based on its previous Egypt and Panama deployment experiences, 1-502 deployed to Egypt again in September 1982. This time its mission was to enforce the Camp David Accords between Egypt and Israel by serving on the Sinai Peninsula as part of the Multinational Force and Observers.

=== Regimental realignment ===
May 1984 saw the first major realignment of the division since before Vietnam. The brigades regimentally aligned, with both 1st and 2d Battalions now coming under 2d Brigade, and 3d Battalion reactivating from the assets and personnel of 1-506 Infantry to complete the set. For the first time since Auxerre, France in 1945, the regiment's three battalions were together under one headquarters, even if the Army wouldn't truly consider it a regiment. At the division reunion that year, long-retired First Sergeant Dovholuk presented the blue silk World War II colors back to 2d Brigade commander John Herrling. They are still on display in the 2d Brigade headquarters.

Concurrent with the reflagging within the 101st, the 4th, 5th and 6th Battalions, 502d Infantry were activated within the Berlin Brigade by reflagging the existing 2d, 3d and 4th Battalions, 6th Infantry. This was part of a wider Army plan to regimentally pair units based within the United States with those stationed overseas for battalion rotational purposes. These three battalions, perpetuating the lineages of World War II Companies D, E and F, 502PIR, were neither airborne nor air assault. The rotation plan was found to be unworkable and was quietly abandoned.

On 12 December 1985, a chartered airliner carrying 248 members of Task Force 3-502 crashed and exploded after takeoff at Gander, Newfoundland, Canada. Mostly from HHC and Company A, they were on the final leg returning from six months of peacekeeping duty in the Sinai Peninsula between Egypt and Israel. The official Canadian government report said it was ice buildup on the wings that caused the crash, but other investigators have pointed to signs of an explosion and suggested everything from terrorism to smuggled souvenir ordnance instead. Whatever the reason, it is the deadliest single day in division history by some counts, outdoing both 6 June 1944 and Vietnam's Battle of Hamburger Hill. LTC Marvin Jeffcoat became the third of the five officers who had commanded 3–502 to that point to die in command. President Ronald Reagan and First Lady Nancy Reagan attended an emotional memorial service on Fort Campbell. Memorials for the fallen were subsequently constructed at Gander Lake, Newfoundland, Canada; near Fort Campbell in Hopkinsville, Kentucky; and on post between Screaming Eagle and Normandy Boulevards.

=== Persian Gulf War ===
The "Strike" Brigade moved to Saudi Arabia as part of Operation Desert Shield in late summer 1990 to deter a possible Iraqi invasion. During Operation Desert Storm, the 2d Brigade and 101st Airborne Division (Air Assault) cut the enemy's lines of communications, struck deep into the country, threatened a strike against the capital, and shut off any escape. On 24 February 1991, the "Strike" Brigade participated in the largest helicopter air assault in military history to establish FOB Cobra and FOB Viper with the final objective to cut off Iraqi forces on Highway 8 from moving west and supplies from Basrah. The brigade redeployed to Fort Campbell in March 1991.

=== Peacekeeping ===
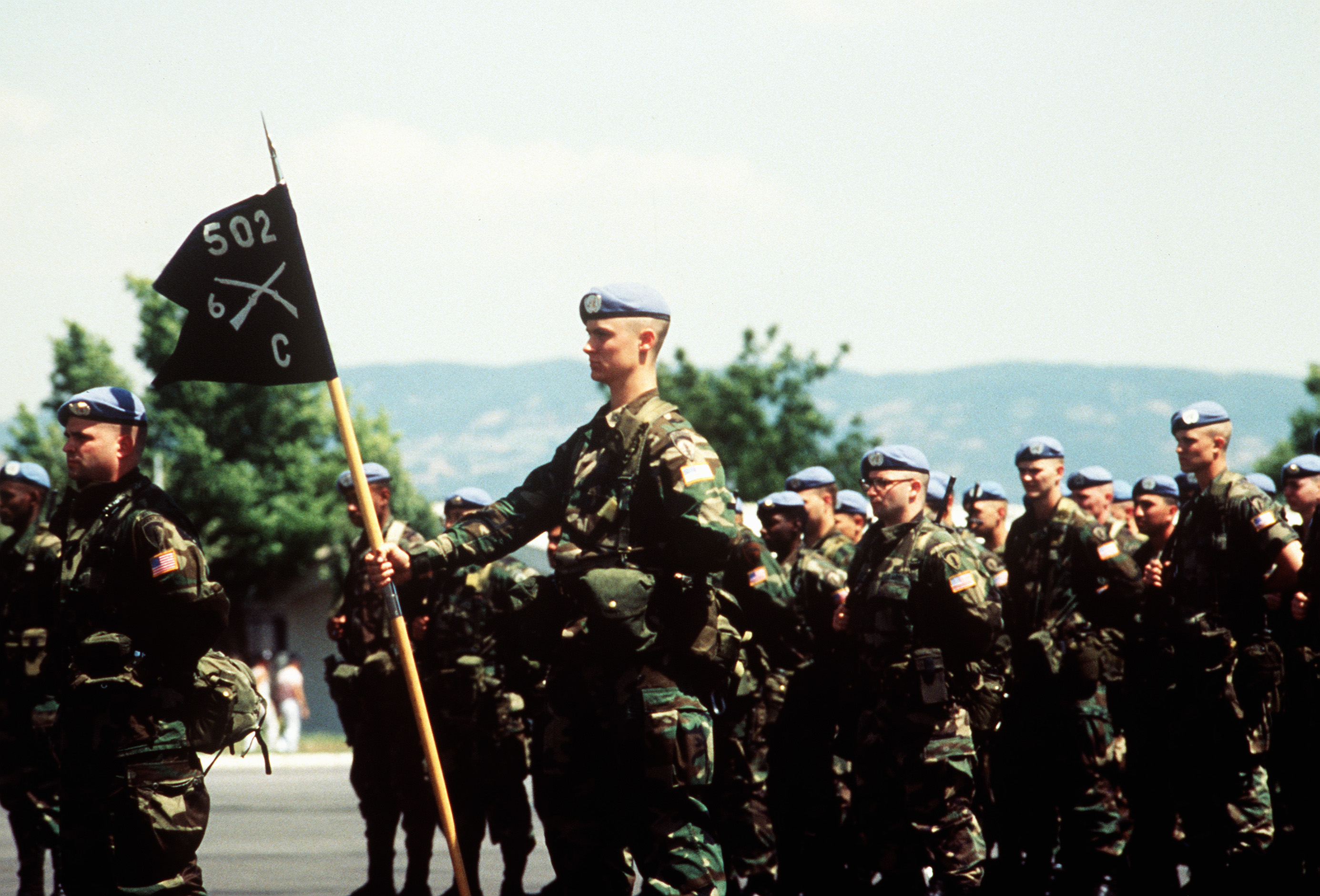
Soldiers from the 6th Bn, 502d Infantry, Berlin Brigade 1993 in Skopje

In December 1990, 4-502d, was the first unit of U.S. Army Berlin to inactivate, moved to Fort Campbell and cased its colors, the personnel moving to other assignments in the division.

On 3 July 1991, soldiers of HHC and Company B, 6th Battalion, 502d Infantry (and elements of the 42d Engineer Co & FIST) became Task Force 6-502d, making the first deployment of the brigade's history, by deploying for Operation Provide Comfort II in Turkey. Upon return to Berlin, in October 1991, these soldiers were authorized wear of the Berlin Brigade SSI as a combat patch on their right shoulders, the only soldiers authorized do so.

On 6 July 1993, soldiers of Company C, 6th Battalion, 502d Infantry landed at Petrovec Airport close to Skopje, Macedonia. It was the first US Army unit to deploy to Macedonia and it was the last deployment of the BBDE outside of Berlin. The reinforced company (additional elements came from HHC Berlin Brigade; 42d Engineer Company; Company D (TOW), 6th Bn, 502d Infantry; FIST, 5th Bn, 502d Infantry; and the 287th Military Police Company) from the Berlin Brigade were to take part in the United Nations Protection Force (UNPROFOR) mission to monitor the Macedonia-Serb border. The operation was named "Able Sentry." Lt. Col. Walter Holton was the commander of the 315-member task force in Macedonia. It was under operational control of the UNPROFOR commander, Danish Brig. Gen. F. Saermark Thomsen. The Task Force returned to Berlin in January 1994.

On 4 July 1994, The 5th and 6th battalions drew down and were inactivated and relieved from assignment to U.S. Army Berlin.

In 1994, 502d soldiers from the 101st deployed to Panama in support of Operation Safe Passage the repatriation of Cuban refugees. In 1999, 3-502d Infantry deployed to Panama in support of JOTC (Jungle Operations Training Center), the infantry augmentation of U.S. forces during the draw down of United States military in Panama.

In 1999, Company A, 2-502d Infantry deployed to Bosnia-Herzegovina as the Quick Reaction Force (QRF) for Stabilization Force 6 (SFOR6). This deployment fell under the command of the United Nations. The deployment did not conclude until 2000, after the new year's millennium celebration.

In 2001, 2-502d deployed to Kosovo and elements of 3-502d to the Republic of Macedonia, where they participated in a rotation as part of NATO's Kosovo Force.

=== Iraq War ===
The 502nd was called on again in 2003, when it headed the 101st's combat air assault into Iraq. Colonel Joe Anderson's brigade was selected to provide light infantry support to the 3d Infantry Division during the 2003 Iraq War. It returned a year later having fought in the key battles of Najaf, south Al Hillah, Karbala, and Mosul. It also completed the two longest air assaults in division history. While deployed, the 502d was instrumental in rebuilding the city of Mosul, Iraq. They formed a city council and held the first free elections in the country since the fall of the regime. Over the subsequent nine months, the regiment rebuilt the city's hospitals, schools and water system. It also built a regional police force that became the model for the rest of the country. Under the watchful eye of the soldiers from the 502d, former Iraqi military personnel were paid for their service and the new Iraqi Dinar was introduced. Above all, the regiment fostered a secure environment that allowed the citizens of Mosul to live in a free and safe city which became a beacon of hope throughout Iraq. Upon their redeployment to Fort Campbell, the 502d underwent transformation as part of the 2d Brigade Combat Team, 101st Airborne Division.

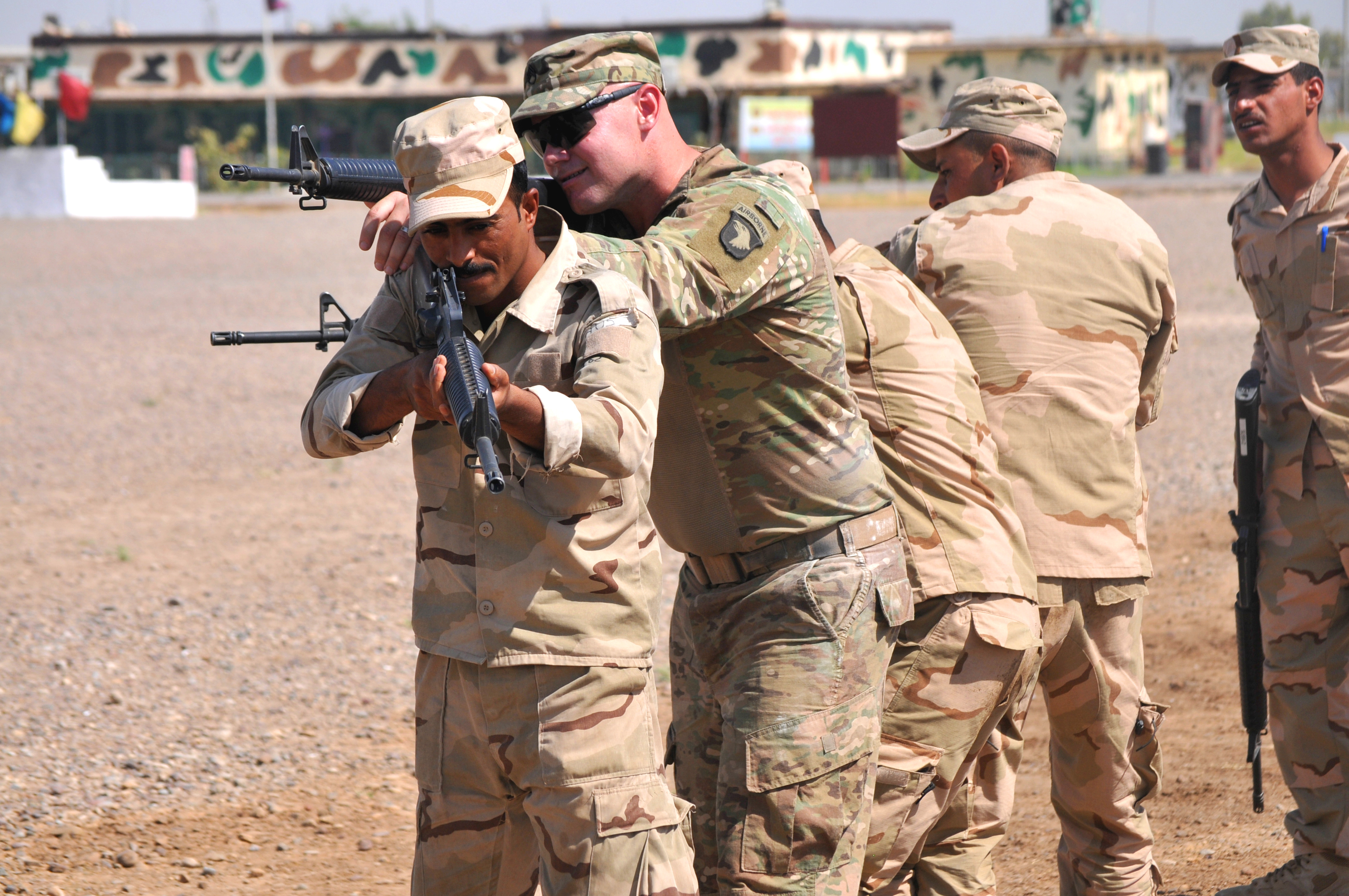
A trainer with Company A, 1st Battalion 502nd Infantry Regiment, Task Force Strike, 101st Airborne Division assists Iraqi army ranger students during a room clearing drill at Camp Taji, Iraq 18 July 2016.

The newly formed 2d Brigade Combat Team deployed again to Iraq in support of Operation Iraqi Freedom in fall 2005 for 15 months. While deployed, the soldiers of the 502d continued to improve security conditions within their assigned area of operations and began to train Iraqi security forces within Southern Baghdad and the infamous area of Mahamudiyah, Lutafiyah and Yusifiyah. During their deployment, the Strike Brigade lost 67 soldiers with numerous wounded in combat operations in an area where over 4,200 IEDs were found during their tenure. Strike soldiers once again deployed for 13 months in late 2007 north of Baghdad where they continued to train Iraqi security forces while fighting the Jaish al-Mahdi paramilitary force.

In March 2006, four 502nd soldiers raped and murdered 14-year-old Abeer Qasim Hamza, as well as killing her parents and 6-year-old younger sister. Two other soldiers in the unit were informed of their intentions but chose to remain silent, and the crime was initially covered up until a whistleblower came forward. Several US soldiers were subsequently killed by insurgents in retaliation for the crime, including members of the 502nd.

On 31 August 2016, Clarksville Online reported U.S. soldiers from the 1st Battalion, 502d Infantry Regiment, Task Force Strike, 101st Airborne Division (Air Assault), took charge of a Ranger training program for qualified volunteers from Iraqi security forces at Camp Taji, Iraq. The Ranger training program, led by Company A, 1-502d, is designed to lay the foundation for an elite Iraqi unit.

=== War in Afghanistan ===
In 2010, the 2nd Brigade deployed to Kandahar Province, Afghanistan as part of the troop surge into the most unsecured areas. "Strike" Brigade successfully flushed out the Taliban fighters from the birthplace of the Taliban. Strike Brigade continued operations that had become the first American battalion to occupy areas within Zhari District of Kandhar Province. After relieving the 2nd Battalion, 508th PIR, 4th Brigade, 82nd Airborne Division in place, the Strike Brigade breached further into the "green zone," a fertile area that borders the northern bank of the Arghandab river, and held a strategic area of land Taliban fighters had been using for years.

One of the major operations during Strike Brigade's tour was Operation Dragon Strike. Operation Dragon Strike officially launched on 15 September 2010. After a couple of months of fighting, Operation Dragon Strike ended in a coalition victory. The mission of Operation Dragon Strike was to drive insurgent forces from the Arghandab district of the Kandahar Province.

=== Transformation ===
Following the invasion of Iraq in 2003, the regiment was transformed and refitted along with the rest of the division. At that time, the 3d Battalion was again inactivated and the 1st Squadron, 75th Cavalry activated in its place as the strike brigade's RSTA (reconnaissance, surveillance, and target acquisition) squadron. It also adopted 1st Battalion, 320th FAR (Field Artillery Regiment), the 526th BSB (Brigade Support Battalion, consisting of a number of logistical and maintenance personnel), and the 2d BCT's Special Troops Battalion. The STB, formed in part from personnel and equipment of the inactivating 311th Military Intelligence Battalion, was activated with four companies consisting of engineers, communications and signal, military intelligence, military police, and several other specialized and low-density military occupational specialties. These units were again deployed to Iraq in support of the 4th Infantry Division in September 2005.

=== 3rd Battalion ===
The 3rd Battalion received the Army's Valorous Unit Award and Meritorious Unit Citation for the battles in Karbala against Saddam's insurgents attacking 3rd ID's supply lines.

By direction of the Secretary of the Army, the Valorous Unit Award is awarded to:

3d Battalion, 502d Infantry Regiment, 101st Airborne Division

for extraordinary heroism in action:

During the period of 5 April 2003 to 6 April 2003, the 3d Battalion, 502d Infantry displayed extraordinary heroism in action against an armed enemy in support of Operation Iraqi Freedom. Immediately upon approaching the outskirts of the city, the lead element of the task force came under intense rocket propelled grenade and machine gun fire from a prepared and determined enemy. Still separated from the city by nearly a kilometer of open ground, close air support was called in, followed by a devastatingly accurate combination of attack aviation, battalion mortar, and artillery fires. While still under withering fire, all elements of the battalion continued advancing toward the city. Through sound tactical execution and bold leadership, 3d Battalion, 502d Infantry fought its way into the city with undaunted courage, closing with and inflicting heavy casualties upon the fanatical Fedayeen Saddam with a fierce and indomitable fighting spirit. Overhead, Kiowa Warrior pilots from the 2d Battalion, 17th Cavalry displayed phenomenal courage and utter disregard for their own safety while observing and adjusting indirect fires, and placing their own fire on key enemy strong points, facilitating the advance of the task force within the city. Fierce fighting continued throughout the day, along with the treatment and evacuation of friendly casualties, but the intrepid acts of so many brave soldiers resulted in 3d Battalion, 502d Infantry inexorably closing in on their objective while destroying all enemy that lay in their path. The 3d Battalion, 502d Infantry valor, stamina, devotion to duty and professional excellence shown throughout this battle reflect great credit upon themselves, the 101st Airborne Division, and the United States Army.

— Secretary of the Army, Valorous Unit Award for actions in the Battle of Karbala

== Lineage ==
- Constituted 14 June 1942 in the Army of the United States as the 502d Parachute Infantry Regiment

1st Battalion concurrently consolidated with the 502d Parachute Battalion (constituted 14 March 1941 in the Army of the United States and activated 1 July 1941 at Fort Benning, Georgia) and consolidated unit designated as the 1st Battalion, 502d Parachute Infantry Regiment.

Regiment (less 1st Battalion) activated 2 March 1942 at Fort Benning, Georgia.

- Assigned 15 August 1942 to the 101st Airborne Division.
- Inactivated 30 November 1945 in France
- Re-designated 18 June 1948 as the 502d Airborne Infantry Regiment.
- Allotted 25 June 1948 to the Regular Army
- Activated 6 July 1948 at Camp Breckinridge, Kentucky
- Inactivated 1 April 1949 at Camp Breckinridge, Kentucky
- Activated 25 August 1950 at Camp Breckinridge, Kentucky
- Inactivated 1 December 1953 at Camp Breckinridge, Kentucky
- Activated 15 May 1954 at Fort Jackson, South Carolina
- Relieved 25 April 1957 from assignment to the 101st Airborne Division; concurrently reorganized and re-designated as the 502d Infantry, a parent regiment under the Combat Arms Regimental System.
- Withdrawn 29 June 1984 from the Combat Arms Regimental System and reorganized under the United States Army Regimental System

== Honors ==
=== Campaign participation credit ===
- World War II:
  - Normandy (with arrowhead)
  - Rhineland (with arrowhead)
  - Ardennes-Alsace
  - Central Europe
- Vietnam:
1. Defense
2. Counteroffensive
3. Counteroffensive, Phase II
4. Counteroffensive, Phase III
5. Tet Counteroffensive
6. Counteroffensive, Phase IV
7. Counteroffensive, Phase V
8. Counteroffensive, Phase VI
9. Tet 69/Counteroffensive; Summer-Fall 1969
10. Winter-Spring 1970
11. Sanctuary Counteroffensive
12. Counteroffensive, Phase VII
13. Consolidation I
14. Consolidation II
- Southwest Asia:
1. Defense of Saudi Arabia
2. Liberation and Defense of Kuwait
- Operation Iraqi Freedom
1. OIF I (Invasion)
2. OIF V Northwest Baghdad (troop surge)
3. OIF 07-09
- Operation Enduring Freedom
1. OEF X Kandahar (troop surge)

=== Decorations ===
- Presidential Unit Citation (Army) for NORMANDY
- Presidential Unit Citation (Army) for BASTOGNE
- Presidential Unit Citation (Army) for AN KHE
- Presidential Unit Citation (Army) for DAK TO, VIETNAM 1966
- Presidential Unit Citation (Army) for KANDAHAR (Operation Enduring Freedom 10–11)
- Valorous Unit Award for QUANG THUONG DISTRICT
- Valorous Unit Award for TUY HOA
- Valorous Unit Award for NAM HOA DISTRICT
- Valorous Unit Award for BA LONG DISTRICT
- Valorous Unit Award for KARBALA (3rd Battalion)
- Valorous Unit Award for KANDAHAR
- Meritorious Unit Commendation (Army) for VIETNAM 1965–1966
- Meritorious Unit Commendation (Army) for SOUTHWEST ASIA (1st Battalion only, U.S. Army General Order 1, 31 March 1996 section VIII)
- Meritorious Unit Commendation (Army) for AFGHANISTAN 2014
- Meritorious Unit Commendation (Army) for IRAQ 2017
- Army Superior Unit Award for 1985 (3rd Battalion)
- Army Superior Unit Award for 1993–1994 (5th & 6th Battalion's; Berlin Brigade)
- Joint Meritorious Unit Award for 6th Battalion's participation in Operation Able Sentry in the Former Yugoslav Republic of Macedonia in 1993–1994
- French Croix de Guerre with Palm, World War II for NORMANDY
- Belgian Croix de Guerre 1940 with Palm for BASTOGNE; cited in the Order of the Day of the Belgian Army for action at Bastogne
- Belgian Fourragere 1940; Cited in the Order of the Day of the Belgian Army for action in France and Belgium

== Notable soldiers ==
- George Van Horn Moseley, Jr., original commander, on D-Day led the 502 PIR into Normandy
- Robert G. Cole, commander of 3rd Battalion, 502nd PIR and Medal of Honor recipient
- Joe E. Mann, Private First Class, 502nd PIR, Medal of Honor recipient
- Colin Powell commanded 2d Brigade, 101st Airborne Division, which included elements of the 502d, and later became Chairman of the Joint Chiefs of Staff and Secretary of State under George W. Bush.
- Frank Rocco Fratellenico U.S. Army Medal of Honor recipient in the Vietnam War
- Harrison C. Summers, hero of D-Day
- Steven Dale Green, James P. Barker, Paul E. Cortez, Jesse V. Spielman, raped and murdered a 14-year-old girl and her family in Iraq.
- Thomas Lowell Tucker and Kristian Menchaca, two soldiers kidnapped and murdered during an attack on a roadside checkpoint on 18 June 2006, in retaliation for the regiment's involvement in the aforementioned crime.
- Noah Galloway, Purple Heart recipient and amputee who was on cover of Men's Health and Dancing with the Stars.

== See also ==
- Brothers in Arms: Road to Hill 30, video game based on the true story of the 502nd Parachute Infantry Regiment who were dropped in Saint-Côme-du-Mont behind German lines on D-Day
- June 2006 abduction of U.S. soldiers in Iraq
- Mahmudiyah rape and killings
