= Robert G. Cole =

United States Army Medal of Honor recipient

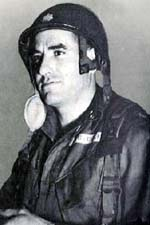
- Born: Robert George Cole; March 19, 1915; San Antonio, Texas, U.S.
- Died: September 18, 1944 (aged 29); Best, Netherlands
- Burial place: Netherlands American Cemetery and Memorial, Margraten, Netherlands
- Education: United States Military Academy
- Spouse: Allie Mae Wilson
- Children: 1
- Military career
- Allegiance: United States of America
- Branch: United States Army
- Service years: 1934–1935; 1939–1944
- Rank: Lieutenant colonel
- Commands: 3rd Battalion, 502nd PIR, 101st Airborne Division
- Conflicts: World War II; Battle of Normandy; Battle of Carentan; Operation Market Garden †
- Awards: Medal of Honor; Purple Heart

Robert George Cole (March 19, 1915 – September 18, 1944) was an American soldier who received the Medal of Honor for his actions during the Battle of Normandy in World War II. Cole, the commander of the 3rd Battalion of the 502nd Parachute Infantry Regiment of the 101st Airborne Division, successfully led his outgunned unit in a daring bayonet charge against an entrenched German force. He was killed in action three months later during Operation Market Garden.

== Early life and education ==
Cole was born on March 19, 1915, at Fort Sam Houston in San Antonio, Texas. His father was Colonel Clarence Leroy Cole, an Army doctor, and his mother Clara was a schoolteacher. Cole graduated from Thomas Jefferson High School in San Antonio in 1933 and enlisted the United States Army in 1934. In 1935, he accepted an appointment to the United States Military Academy at West Point. Cole graduated in 1939 and married his sweetheart, Allie Mae Wilson, with whom he had a son.

== Military service ==
After graduation from West Point, Cole was commissioned as a second lieutenant and assigned to the 15th Infantry Regiment at Fort Lewis, Washington. In 1941, he volunteered for paratrooper training and joined the 501st Parachute Infantry Regiment at Fort Benning, Georgia, earning his jump wings in March. Cole rose in the ranks rapidly, and by D-Day in mid-1944, Lieutenant Colonel Cole was the commander of the 3rd Battalion of the 502nd Parachute Infantry Regiment of the 101st Airborne Division.

=== Battle of Normandy ===
On June 6, 1944, Cole parachuted into France with the 502nd as part of the American airborne landings in Normandy. Landing behind Utah Beach, he assembled 75 men and assaulted German positions before aiding the landing of the 4th Infantry Division.

During the Battle of Carentan on June 10, the objective of Cole's 3rd Battalion was a bridge over the Douve River near Carentan, the linkup point with the 29th Infantry Division coming inland from Omaha Beach. Cole led 265 men toward the bridge down a narrow, exposed causeway flanked by marshes. Entrenched German soldiers began to fire upon the battalion, inflicting considerable casualties with rifles, machine guns, and mortars. Pinned down with little cover, the battalion assumed defensive positions for the night. When air support failed to dislodge the Germans the next day, Cole rallied his men:

These goose-stepping Heinies think they know how to fight a war! We're about to learn 'em a lesson! There's several thousand Krauts in front of us and only a few hundred left of us, but we are well able to take this thing. We can't even think about taking prisoners. I'm gonna put such an artillery barrage on them that we hope they'll be addled. I want you to put your bayonets on your rifles. We'll call for smoke. When you hear me blow the whistle, get up and charge to the orchard behind that farmhouse. If your buddy gets hit, keep going, you can't afford to stop! Go ahead and smoke a cigarette. For some of you it will be your last cigarette, because some of you won't make it. When I blow the whistle, I want every one of you goddamn jayhawks right on my ass!

Cole then blew his whistle, beginning the bayonet charge under cover of a smoke screen, leading his unit from the front with his pistol, eventually taking up a rifle from one of the fallen men. The charge was successful in driving the Germans away but at a heavy cost, with 130 of Cole's 265 men becoming casualties. Afterward, the 1st Battalion of the 502nd, along with concentrated artillery fire, eliminated the remainder of German resistance near the bridge.

For his leadership in the daring assault, later known as "Cole's Charge," Cole was recommended for the Medal of Honor.

=== Operation Market Garden ===
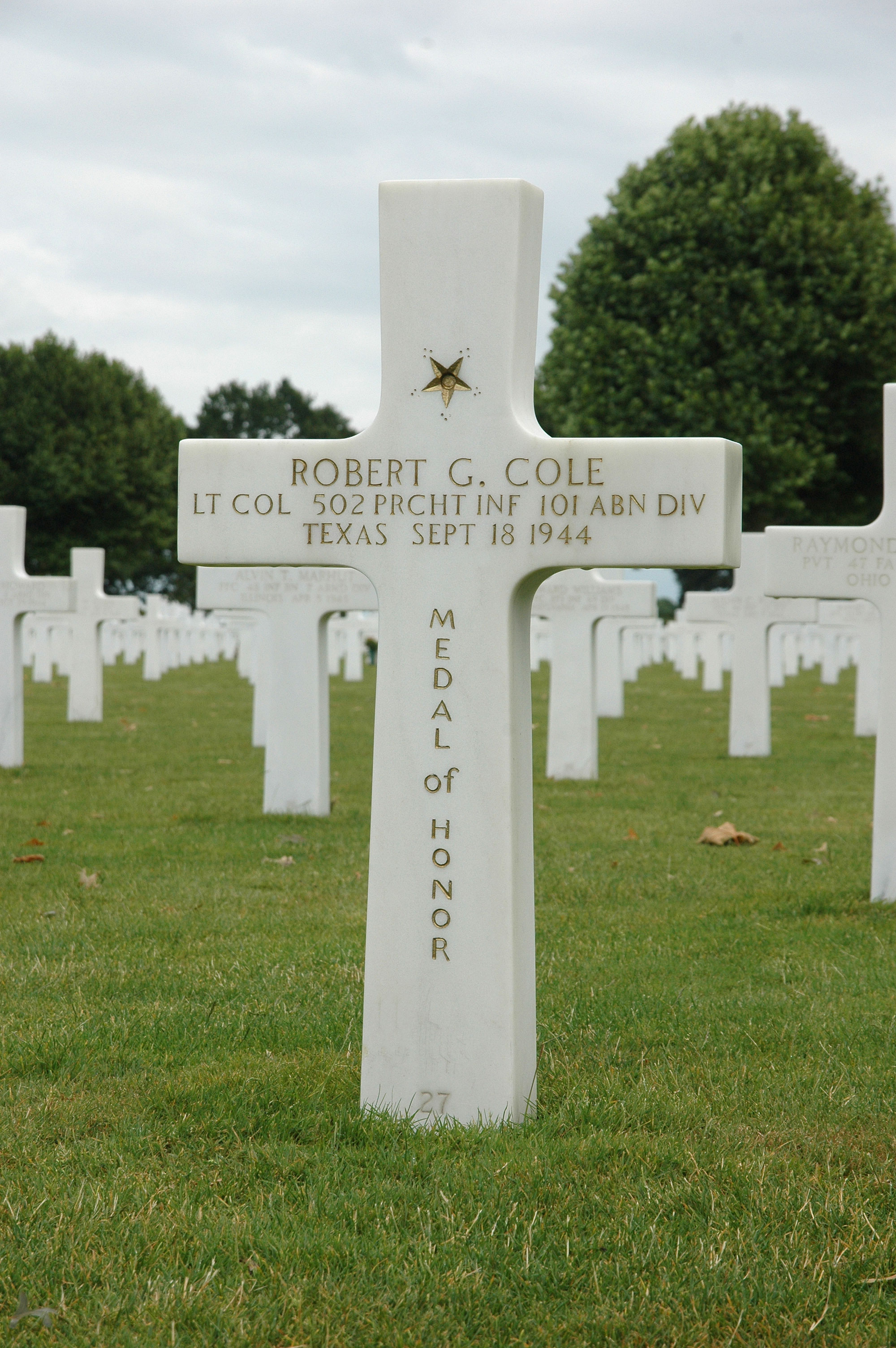
Grave at Netherlands American Cemetery and Memorial in Margraten

On September 18, 1944, Cole's 3rd Battalion was fighting in Best, Netherlands, during Operation Market Garden. He had requested air support and was in radio contact with a pilot who required the placement of orange identification panels to mark the battalion's position to protect it from friendly fire. While looking skyward to sight the plane, Cole was shot and killed by a German sniper in a farmhouse 100 yards (91 m) away.

Walter Cronkite, reporting for United Press, wrote that Cole "knew the woods were filled with German snipers...so rather than order a man into the field to place the panels, Cole carried them himself." Trooper Robert Boyce from I Company shot down a German soldier escaping the house, and historian Mark Bando wrote that the "men of the 3rd Battalion assured themselves that Cole's slayer had been killed and his death avenged."

== Legacy ==
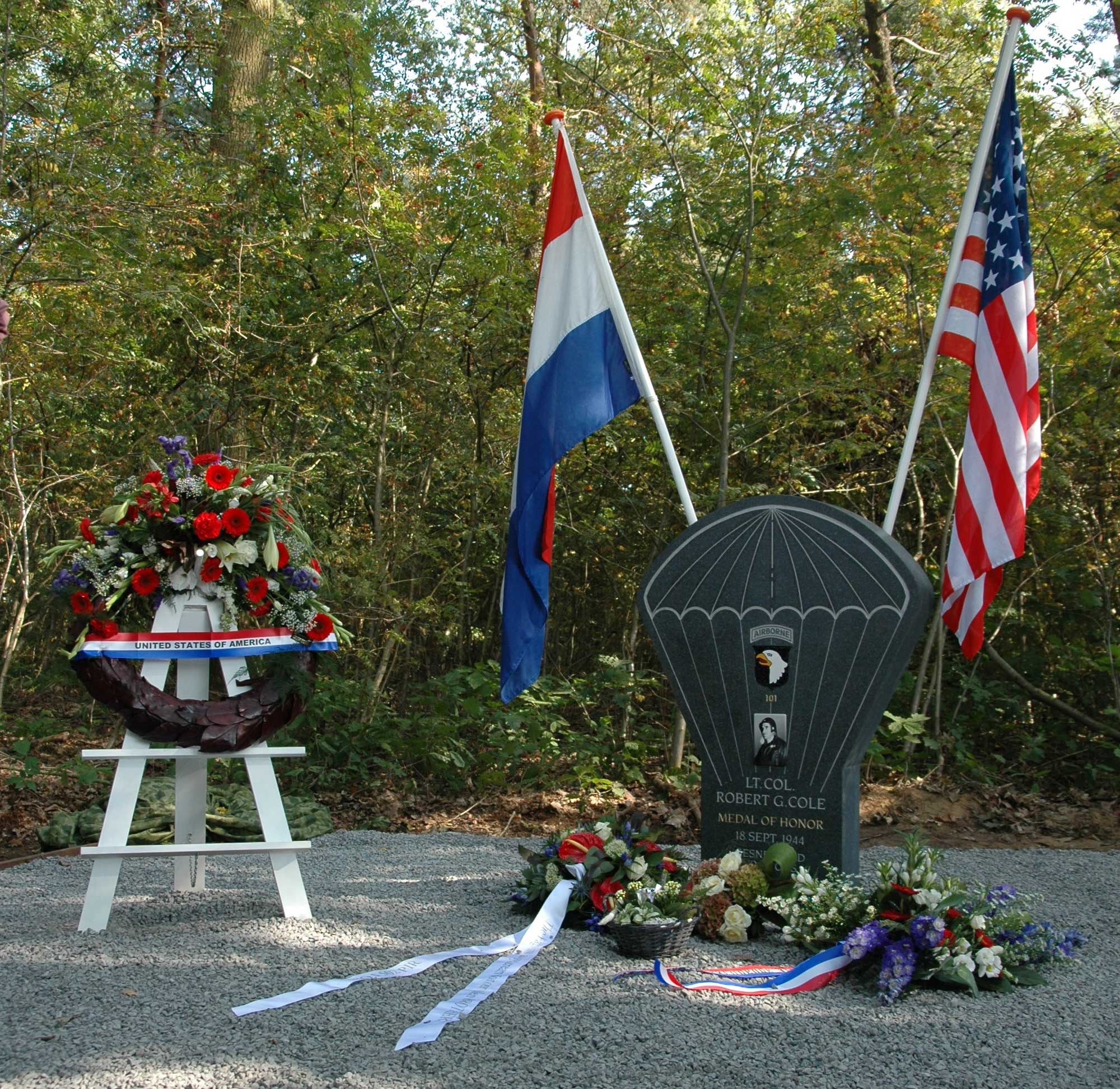
Memorial to Cole in Best, Netherlands

Cole was posthumously awarded the Medal of Honor for his actions of June 11, 1944. The honor was accepted by his widow Allie on October 30, 1944, at a ceremony at Fort Sam Houston.

Cole was buried at Netherlands American Cemetery and Memorial in Margraten. He is honored with a plaque in Carentan near where he ordered his bayonet charge, as well as a plaque in Best near where he was killed.

Robert G. Cole High School at Fort Sam Houston is named in his honor, as is a park at Fort Campbell, Kentucky.

== Medal of Honor citation ==
The citation reads as follows:

For gallantry and intrepidity at the risk of his own life, above and beyond the call of duty on 11 June 1944, in France. Lt. Col. Cole was personally leading his battalion in forcing the last 4 bridges on the road to Carentan when his entire unit was suddenly pinned to the ground by intense and withering enemy rifle, machinegun, mortar, and artillery fire placed upon them from well-prepared and heavily fortified positions within 150 yards [140 m] of the foremost elements. After the devastating and unceasing enemy fire had for over 1 hour prevented any move and inflicted numerous casualties, Lt. Col. Cole, observing this almost hopeless situation, courageously issued orders to assault the enemy positions with fixed bayonets. With utter disregard for his own safety and completely ignoring the enemy fire, he rose to his feet in front of his battalion and with drawn pistol shouted to his men to follow him in the assault. Catching up a fallen man's rifle and bayonet, he charged on and led the remnants of his battalion across the bullet-swept open ground and into the enemy position. His heroic and valiant action in so inspiring his men resulted in the complete establishment of our bridgehead across the Douve River. The cool fearlessness, personal bravery, and outstanding leadership displayed by Lieutenant Colonel Cole reflect great credit upon himself and are worthy of the highest praise in the military service.

== See also ==
- List of Medal of Honor recipients
- List of Medal of Honor recipients for World War II
