= Wallace Strobel =

First Lieutenant in the US Army

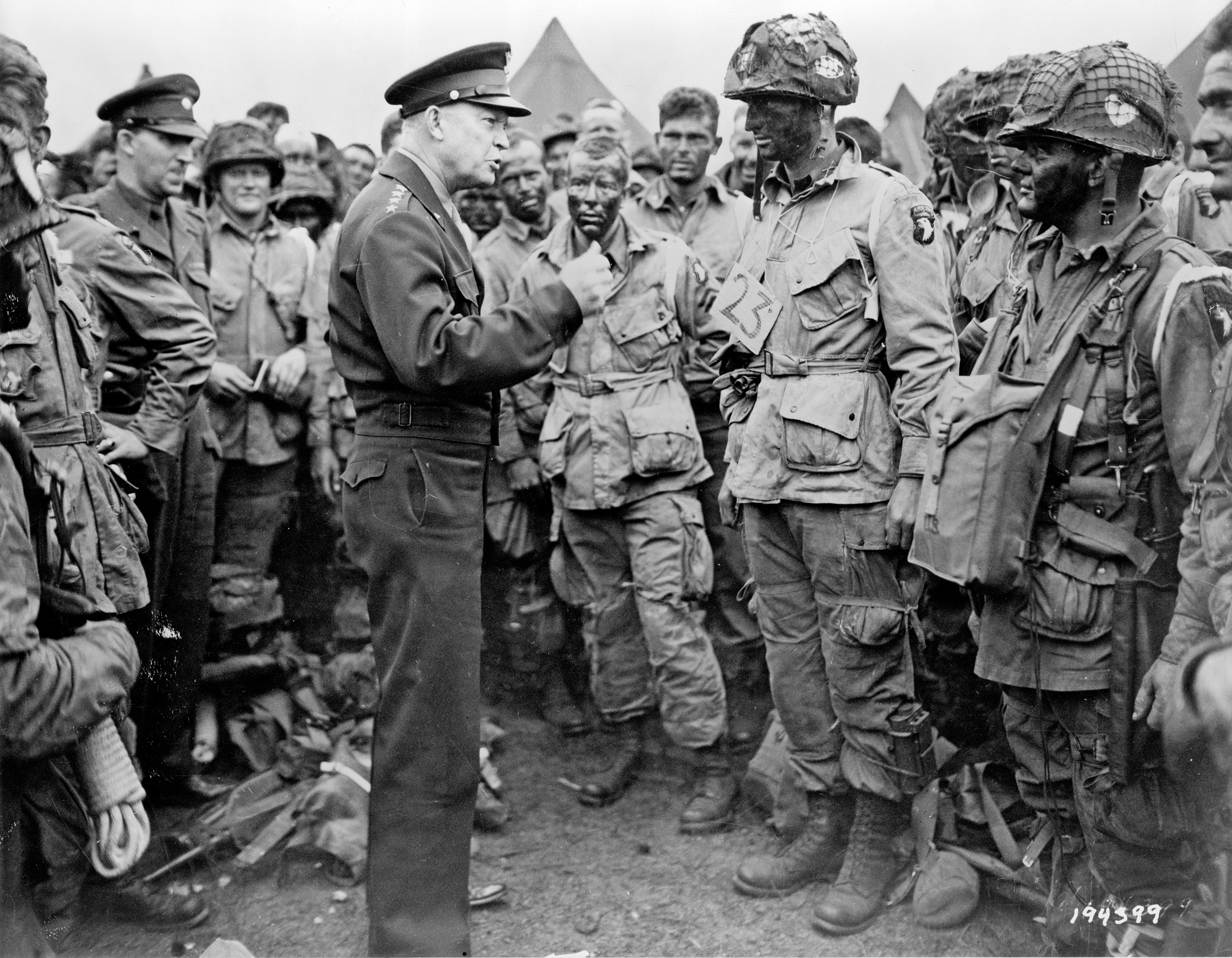
Strobel (wearing number 23 placard) and the members of Company E, 502nd Parachute Infantry Regiment, 101st Airborne Division listening to General Dwight D. Eisenhower the night before D-Day

Wallace C. Strobel (June 5, 1922 – August 27, 1999) was a United States Army officer who was the subject of a famous photograph during World War II. Strobel, at the time a lieutenant in the 502nd Parachute Infantry Regiment, was photographed with General Dwight D. Eisenhower the night before the regiment's jump into Normandy on June 6, 1944. The picture captured Eisenhower speaking to paratroopers of the 101st Airborne Division on the eve of the invasion and remains one of the most compelling and classic images from World War II, as well as one of the most famous of General Eisenhower.

Strobel described the photo as follows:

"The picture was taken at Greenham Common Airfield in England about 8:30 p.m. on June 5, 1944. My 22nd birthday.

It was shortly before we were to leave the tented assembly area to which, for security reasons, we had been confined for about 5 days. We had darkened our faces and hands with burned cork, cocoa and cooking oil to be able to blend into the darkness and prevent reflection from the moon. We were all very well prepared emotionally for the operation.

The drop packs, that were to be attached to the planes and contained our machine guns, mortars and ammunition, had been prepared earlier, marked with our plane numbers and delivered to the plane. Our plane number was 23 and I was the jumpmaster of that plane. This fact accounts for the sign around my neck in the picture which carries the number 23."

Strobel settled in Saginaw, Michigan after the war. In 2016, his M1911A1 pistol and a collection of captured German pistols were donated to the National WWII Museum in New Orleans. Strobel donated his uniform to the Dwight D. Eisenhower Presidential Library in 1992. His children attended Douglas MacArthur High School and Dwight D. Eisenhower High School (now Heritage High School) in Saginaw. In 1990, the U.S. Postal Service issued a stamp using this photograph of the historic moment.
