= Harrison C. Summers =

American soldier (WW2)

- Born: July 12, 1918; Marion County, West Virginia, U.S.
- Died: August 3, 1983 (aged 65); Rivesville, West Virginia, U.S.
- Military career
- Allegiance: United States
- Branch: United States Army
- Service years: 1942–1945
- Rank: 1st Lieutenant
- Units: 1st Battalion, 502nd Parachute Infantry Regiment, 101st Airborne Division
- Conflicts: World War II: Battle of Normandy; Operation Market Garden; Battle of the Bulge
- Awards: Distinguished Service Cross

Harrison C. Summers (July 12, 1918 – August 3, 1983) was a United States Army soldier and a decorated war veteran. He served with the 1st Battalion, 502nd Parachute Infantry Regiment of the 101st Airborne Division in World War II.

== Early life ==
Summers was born in Marion County, West Virginia, one of six sons to William L. Summers and Florence Swisher.

Summers worked as a coal miner in Rivesville, West Virginia. A bridge there is named in his honor.

== Military service ==
On June 6, 1944, Summers landed as part of the first night drop of troops during the American airborne landings in Normandy. His unit had captured Saint-Germain-de-Varreville, France, near Exit 4 off Utah Beach. Summers and 15 soldiers were ordered by 1st Battalion commander, Lt Col. Patrick Cassidy, to capture a building complex nearby designated "WXYZ" on the field order map. The buildings turned out to be the barracks for 100 or more German soldiers.

Summers led the attack, charging inside with his Thompson submachine gun. He had ordered the others to follow, however only Private William Burt and Private John Camien followed him while the other soldiers stayed behind. He and the two others cleared out the buildings. Five hours later, the position was clear, and Summers killed more than 30 German soldiers.

Summers received an honorable discharge on November 30, 1945, as a 1st Lieutenant. Summers was twice nominated for the Medal of Honor for his efforts that day. However, he was instead awarded the Distinguished Service Cross.

World War II historian Stephen Ambrose described him this way:

Summers is a legend with American paratroopers ..., the Sergeant York of World War II. His story has too much John Wayne/Hollywood in it to be believed, except that more than 10 men saw and reported his exploits.

== Death ==
Summers died of lung cancer on August 3, 1983. He was buried in Beverly Hills Memorial Park in Morgantown, West Virginia.

After his death, his friends and fellow soldiers tried to get him posthumously awarded the Medal of Honor; however the effort failed.

== Dramatizations ==
- Brothers in Arms: Road to Hill 30, in which the character Sergeant Matt Baker is modeled on Summers and "WXYZ", as well as Purple Heart Lane/Cole's Charge.

== See also ==
- Richard Winters
