= George Van Horn Moseley Jr. =

United States Army officer

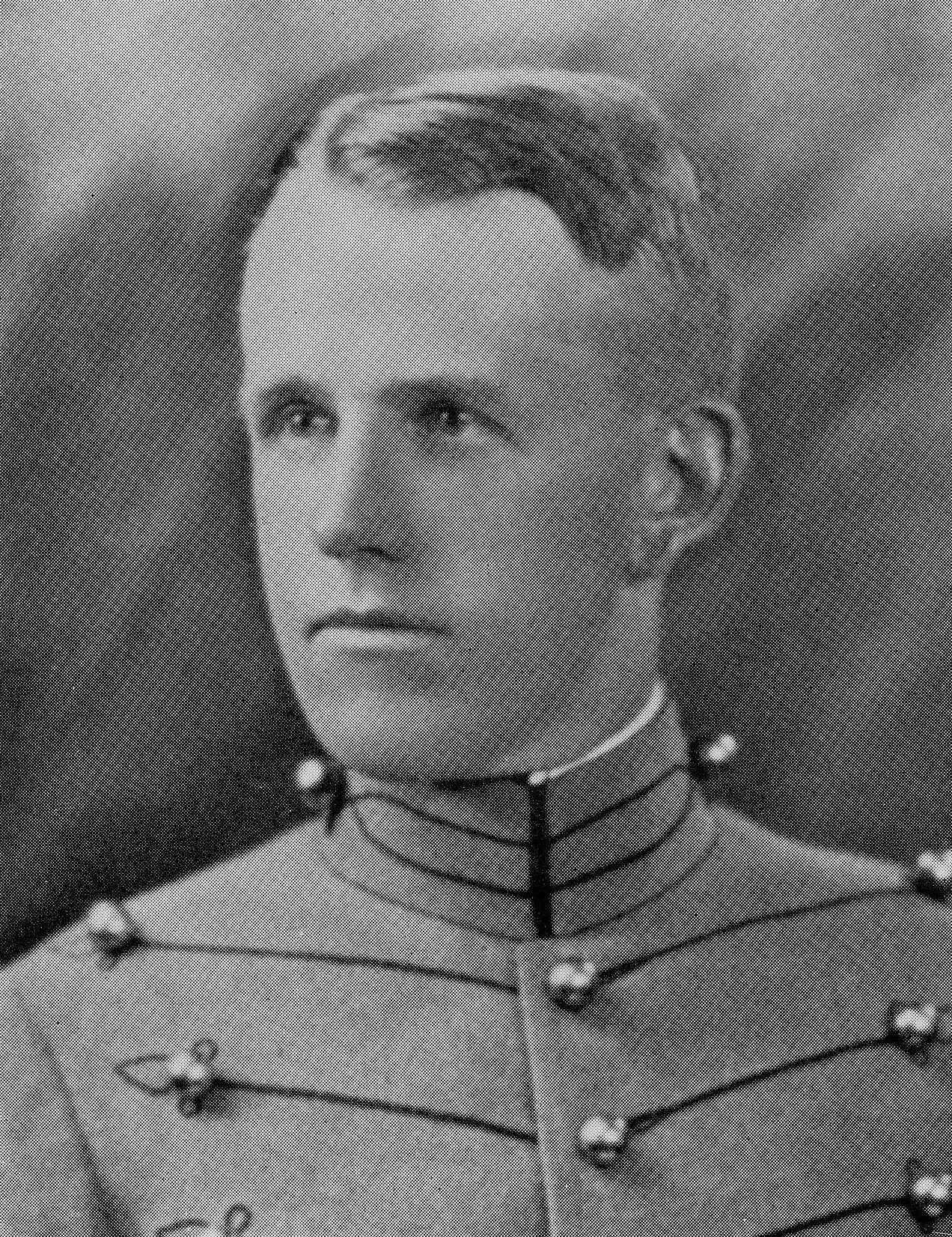
- At West Point in 1927
- Born: January 4, 1905; Fort Sam Houston, Texas
- Died: December 6, 1976 (aged 71); Montague, Massachusetts
- Military career
- Allegiance: United States
- Branch: United States Army
- Service years: 1927–1946
- Rank: Colonel
- Commands: 2d Parachute Training Regiment; 502d Parachute Infantry Regiment
- Conflicts: World War II
- Awards: Legion of Merit; Purple Heart

George Van Horn Moseley Jr. (January 4, 1905 – December 6, 1976) was a United States Army officer who served in World War II and later served as commandant of cadets at Norwich University.

== Early life ==
Moseley was born in Fort Sam Houston, Texas, on January 4, 1905, the son of George Van Horn Moseley and Alice Dodds Moseley. His father, then an officer in the 1st Cavalry Division, later rose to become a major general and Vice Chief of Staff of the Army during the Hoover Administration. Moseley grew up on army posts and in Washington, D.C., where he graduated from Western High School in 1922. He graduated from the United States Military Academy in 1927.

== Military career ==
Moseley served in various command and assignments, obtained a master's degree, taught English at West Point, and served in Tianjin, China, as a company commander with the 15th Infantry Regiment during the 1930s. He commanded, trained, and jumped into Normandy with the 502d Parachute Infantry Regiment on D-Day, June 6, 1944. He was injured on the jump but refused to be evacuated, commanding his regiment from a wheelbarrow for two days. After convalescing in England, he returned to the United States to command the 2d Parachute Training Regiment at Fort Benning, Georgia. He attended the Naval War College at the end of World War II.

== Later life ==
In 1946 Moseley retired to Grafton, Vermont, where he had owned a home for many years. Because of his expertise on China, he returned to serve with HQ Far East Command during the Korean War. Later he served as Commandant of Cadets at Norwich University. He was awarded the Legion of Merit and the Purple Heart.

Moseley died in Montague, Massachusetts, on December 6, 1976, and was buried at Old South Cemetery in Montague.

Correspondence with Douglas MacArthur is quoted in the William Manchester biography American Caesar.

== Sources ==
- Register of Graduates, USMA
- Alfred Cormbise,(2004) The United States 15th Infantry Regiment in China, 1912–1938, McFarland & Co.
- Springfield, Massachusetts Morning Union, December 7, 1976
- Historical and Pictorial Review of the Parachute Battalions, US Army, Ft Benning, Ga, 1942
- Lynchburg News Advance, Lynchburg, Va, September 13, 1944
- The 502nd Parachute Infantry Regiment Unit History
