= Knut H. Raudstein =

American soldier in the U.S. Army during WWII

Knut Harold Raudstein (15 April 1917 in La Center, Washington – 13 December 1988 in San Antonio, Texas) was an American Major in the United States Army during World War II. He was a recipient of the Distinguished Service Cross which was awarded for having distinguished himself by extraordinary heroism against an armed enemy.

== Awards ==
- Parachutist Badge
- Distinguished Service Cross in 1944 as Captain in Company C, 1st Battalion, 506th Parachute Infantry Regiment, 101st Airborne Division
- Bronze Star Medal
- Purple Heart with oak leaf cluster
