= Foucarville =

- Part of Sainte-Mère-Église
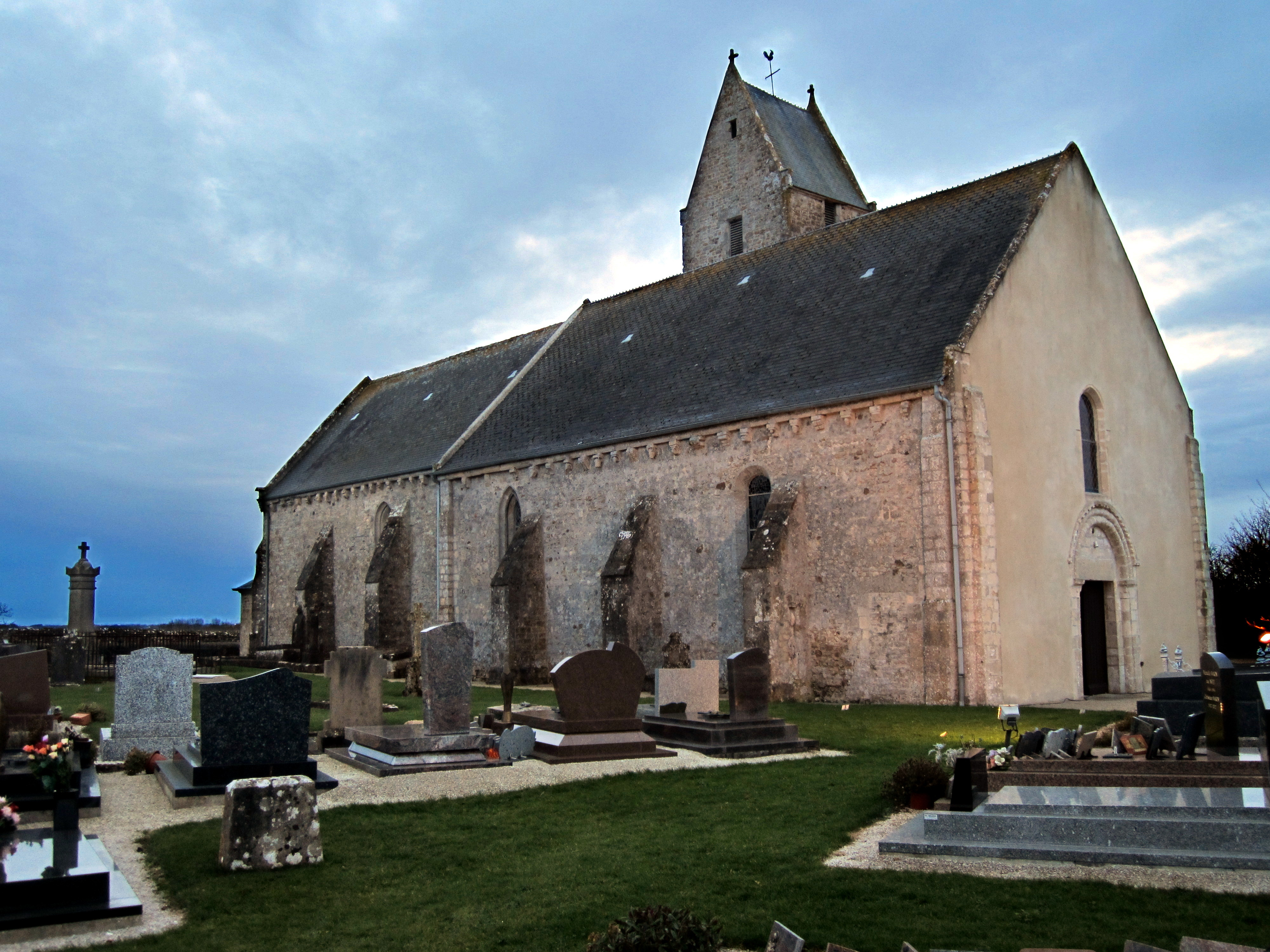
- The church of Saint-Lô
- Location of Foucarville
- Location within France Location within Normandy
- Coordinates: 49°26′33″N 1°15′20″W
- Country: France
- Region: Normandy
- Department: Manche
- Arrondissement: Cherbourg
- Canton: Carentan
- Commune: Sainte-Mère-Église
- Area^{1}: 5.06 km^{2} (1.95 sq mi)
- Highest elevation: 32 m (105 ft)
- Lowest elevation: 1 m (3.3 ft)
- Population (2022): 113
  - Density: 22.3/km^{2} (57.8/sq mi)
- Time zone: UTC+01:00 (CET)
  - Summer (DST): UTC+02:00 (CEST)
- Postal code: 50480
- ^{1} French Land Register data, which excludes lakes, ponds, glaciers > 1 km^{2} (0.386 sq mi or 247 acres) and river estuaries.

Foucarville (French pronunciation: [fukaʁvil]) is a former commune in the Manche department in north-western France. On 1 January 2016, it was merged into the commune of Sainte-Mère-Église.

Following World War II, for 21 months, tens of thousands of Nazi POWs were detained at an Allied prison camp in Foucarville. Officially called the Continental Prisoner of War Enclosure Number 19, it encompassed 306 acres, was powered by hydroelectric power and diesel generators, 2 hospitals, 50 kitchens serving 5 mess halls, 10 workshops, 4 churches 2 theaters and a soccer field. The last prisoners were re-integrated into society at the camp's close on 31 December 1948.

== See also ==
- Communes of the Manche department
