= Justin Roberts (filmmaker) =

American filmmaker and former Army chaplain

Justin Roberts in Kunar Province, Afghanistan, April 2011

Justin David Roberts is an American documentary filmmaker and former United States Army chaplain. He directed the 2015 documentary feature No Greater Love, about the Afghanistan deployment of the infantry battalion in which he served. Chaplains do not carry weapons, and Roberts carried a video camera on his unit's missions, shooting the combat footage used in the documentary. He later co-directed the 2024 documentary Fighting Spirit and directed and produced the documentary series Do Good.

== Early life and education ==
He is from Stephenville, Texas. Roberts has said that from an early age he wanted both to serve in the military and to work in ministry. He told Risen Magazine in 2017 that he had known he "wanted to go into ministry" but also "wanted to serve my country", and that "it eventually dawned on me that I could do both as a chaplain". He has also said that he converted to Christianity at the age of thirteen, after a church gave him a Bible, and has described that as what led him toward chaplaincy. He graduated from McNeese State University in Lake Charles, Louisiana, and holds a Master of Arts in Biblical Studies and a Master of Arts in Media Arts and Communication. He graduated from the media arts program at Dallas Theological Seminary.

== Military service ==
Roberts, far right, with soldiers of the 101st Airborne Division in Kunar Province, Afghanistan

Roberts served as an Army chaplain from 2009 to 2015, about six years on active duty. He held the rank of captain and was assigned to the 2nd Battalion, 327th Infantry Regiment ("No Slack"), 101st Airborne Division, at Fort Campbell, Kentucky. He told the Leaf-Chronicle that the battalion had its first suicide on his second day with the unit and lost four soldiers to suicide before it deployed.

The battalion deployed to Kunar Province in eastern Afghanistan in 2010 for a year-long tour during the war in Afghanistan. Because chaplains do not carry weapons, Roberts took a camera on missions to film the soldiers he ministered to. Of the battalion's roughly 800 soldiers, 18 were killed in action and more than 200 Purple Hearts were awarded over the deployment.

Military Times reported in 2017 that the battalion recorded no suicides after returning from Afghanistan and that reported suicidal ideation fell sharply. Roberts described the unit's approach in that period as one that set aside slide-based briefings in favor of peer relationships, telling the publication, "We broke away from the PowerPoint stuff, and we focused on the brotherhood and sisterhood."

== Filmmaking ==
Roberts has said that he gave combat footage he had shot to the war correspondent Mike Boettcher, that the same footage was used in The Hornet's Nest, a 2014 theatrical documentary, and that he served as a co-executive producer on that film.

=== No Greater Love ===
No Greater Love is a feature documentary that Roberts directed, produced and co-wrote, about the battalion's Kunar deployment and the soldiers' return home. It was given a limited U.S. theatrical release by Atlas Distribution Company on November 10, 2017, over Veterans Day weekend.

Reviewing the film for Variety, Joe Leydon called it "a fascinating and heartfelt documentary" and wrote that Roberts was "too honest a first-time filmmaker" to offer easy answers to the problems his interviewees describe. Writing in the Los Angeles Times, Kimber Myers said there is "an inescapable sense of immediacy and real risk within 'No Greater Love'" and that the film "exists beyond politics and beyond religion, devoting its energy to story after story of bravery". She added that it "isn't always as technically proficient as the audience might want it to be — especially its sometimes distracting editing — but it's both effective and affecting in its emotionally raw narrative". Alan Zilberman of The Washington Post called it "a remarkable film about war and its effect on soldiers", but was critical of its construction, writing that "Roberts is not a natural documentarian, using a sermon as an awkward framing device" and that interviews "often cut to him listening intently, which interrupts the flow of the stories". Movieguide called the film "one of the most powerful, best documentaries ever made".

Deadline reported in 2017 that the film had by then won 11 awards on the festival circuit. They included Best Documentary and the Mass Impact Award at the Boston Film Festival and Best Military Film at the San Diego Film Festival, and Best Documentary at the Foyle Film Festival in Derry, Northern Ireland, shared with The Mind of Mark DeFriest. Roberts received the Military Filmmaker Award at the 2016 GI Film Festival in Washington, D.C., and the Santini Patriot Spirit Award at the Beaufort International Film Festival the same year.

=== Do Good ===
Roberts's home was destroyed in Hurricane Laura, the Category 4 storm that struck southwest Louisiana in August 2020, as was the office space for his production company. He and Hank Barbe then developed Do Good, a documentary series about community-led recovery in disaster zones; its first episode was released in March 2021.

Roberts filmed in Ukraine for about eight months, covering the civilian impact of the Russo-Ukrainian War and working in Donbas, Mykolaiv and Kharkiv. KPLC reported in 2024 that he and Barbe hoped to produce a feature-length documentary from the material. Roberts founded the production company Echo Bravo Productions, which the American Press described as focused on making "military-, veteran- and first responder-centered films".

=== Fighting Spirit ===
Fighting Spirit: A Combat Chaplain's Journey is a 2024 documentary about United States military chaplains, co-directed by Roberts. Military Times reported that the 72-minute film was produced by the Catholic media company Paulist Productions, and Deadline described it as the first co-production between Hollywood and the United States Army Chaplain Corps. Actor Chris Pratt is credited as an executive producer, as is Roberts.

The film opens with the identification, seventy years after his death, of the remains of Emil Kapaun, a Catholic priest and Army chaplain who died as a prisoner of war during the Korean War and was posthumously awarded the Medal of Honor. Military Times wrote that the documentary "ventures well beyond the experiences of a single chaplain", paying tribute in a series of vignettes to figures including the Four Chaplains who went down with the SS Dorchester and Charles Liteky, who carried 20 soldiers to safety in Vietnam but later renounced his Medal of Honor in protest. The same review found that the film "can feel busy and meandering at times", while concluding that the stories of chaplains "are not as well known as they should be". Roberts told the Deseret News that as a military chaplain "you end up ministering to people who aren't of your faith", and called the work "a ministry, a quiet ministry".

The film was screened at the Vatican in September 2023, and opened in 150 theaters nationwide on November 8, 2024.

== Filmography ==
Documentary features

- No Greater Love (2015), director, producer and co-writer
- Fighting Spirit (2024), co-director and executive producer

Documentary series

- Do Good (2021–present), director and producer
