= General Harper =

General Harper may refer to:

- George Harper (British Army officer) (1865–1922), British Army lieutenant general
- Joseph H. Harper (1901–1990), U.S. Army major general
- Kenton Harper (1801–1867), Virginia Provisional Army brigadier general on the side of the Confederacy in the American Civil War
- Robert Goodloe Harper (1765–1825), U.S. Army major general
