= Hank Barbe =

American musician, film producer and U.S. Army medic

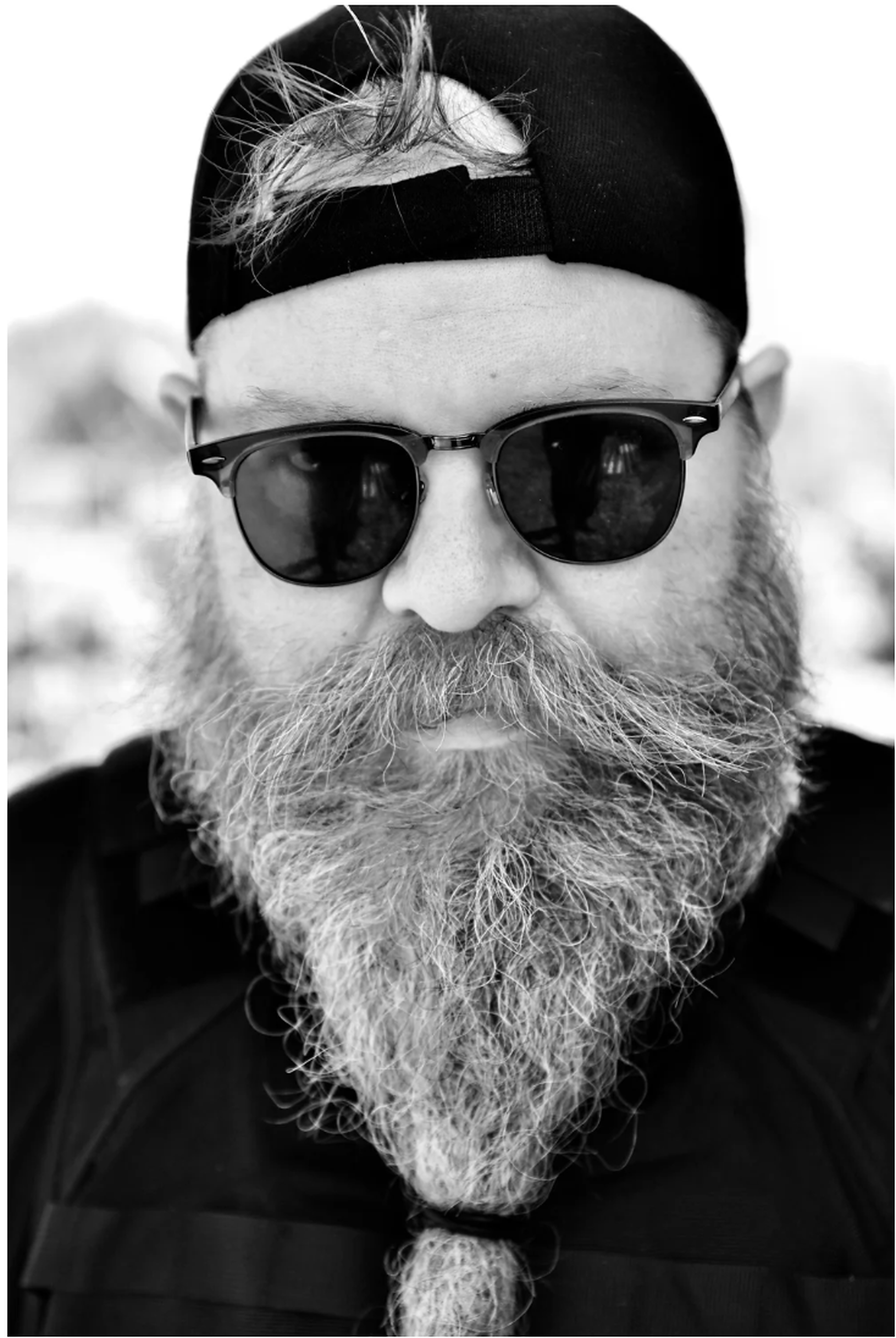
Barbe in Donbas, Ukraine, 2022

Henry "Hank" Barbe is an American musician, documentary film producer and on-camera talent, and former U.S. Army DUSTOFF flight medic. He is the lead vocalist of the San Antonio-based rock band Three Beards, whose 2022 single "Thinking of You" broke the top 100 on the Mediabase chart, and a co-creator of the documentary series Do Good. He served as a U.S. Army flight medic during the 2003 invasion of Iraq; Time profiled his medevac unit that April, and The Washington Post Magazine later reported on his role evacuating wounded paratrooper Pvt. Alan Babin during the same deployment.

== Military service ==
Barbe served four years in the United States Marine Corps (1992–1997) as an Air Command and Control Electronics Operator (military occupational specialty 7234) before transferring to the United States Army, where he served eight years (1997–2004) as a Combat Medic / Health Care Specialist (MOS 91W2O) and then as a DUSTOFF flight medic with the air ambulance company at Fort Riley, Kansas.

In 2003, attached to a medevac unit operating from Tallil Air Base in southeastern Iraq, Barbe was a named co-subject of the Time magazine feature "Anatomy of a Medevac" by Brian Bennett. The article describes him being scrambled overnight on a casualty-evacuation flight in support of forces operating north of Najaf, and quotes him on the team's arrival at the casualty site: "We got there just in Time. The guy was ice cold."

The same deployment included the medevac of Pvt. Alan Babin, a paratrooper with the 82nd Airborne Division who was severely wounded near As Samawah on March 31, 2003. Babin's recovery was the subject of a Washington Post Sunday Magazine cover story by Monte Reel in December 2004; in 2025, NOTUS reported, citing the 2004 Post account, that Barbe was the helicopter medic who evacuated Babin from the battlefield.

== Education ==
Barbe holds a Bachelor of Science in Special Education and Psychology from Excelsior College.

== Civilian career ==
After leaving active duty, Barbe taught special education and coached football. He was the defensive coordinator for the South Johnston Trojans, a Four Oaks, North Carolina high school team coached by Joe Salas. In 2009 the Trojans went 14–1 and reached the NCHSAA 3-AA state championship game, losing 42–28 to Belmont's South Point.

== Music career ==
Barbe is the lead vocalist of Three Beards, a San Antonio-based rock band formed in 2013 that has been described as Americana rock. The band was selected as the Sweet Relief Musicians Fund's ReverbNation Spotlight Artist of the Month in July 2014, and in December 2015 it signed with the Atlanta-based independent label CBM Records and the radio-promotion firm Howard Rosen Promotion.

In 2016, Three Beards performed at the SXSW music festival in Austin, Texas. That year the band released the EP Lessons Learned, which American Service Dogs Magazine characterized as an introspective record reflecting Barbe's post-traumatic stress experience, with proceeds from sales donated to veterans' organizations.

In January 2017, Three Beards performed at the Vettys Inaugural Ball in Washington, D.C., one of the official inaugural balls associated with the first inauguration of Donald Trump. The booking was reported by KSAT-12 in San Antonio, which described Barbe's combined twelve years of military service and noted the band's veteran lineup.

In early 2022, the Three Beards single "Thinking of You" broke the top 100 on the Mediabase chart. The song entered the Mediabase 7-Day Activator Chart at position 105 for the week ending February 26, 2022, and peaked at position 96 the following week, for the week ending March 5, 2022. Broadcast Data Systems airplay-tracking reports for the same chart window listed five U.S. radio stations carrying the song in the contemporary-hit-radio (CHR) format, plus one station in the hot adult contemporary (HAC) format.

In a 2025 interview with CanvasRebel magazine, Barbe described music as a vocation that "kind of landed in my lap" after a teaching-career injury, and characterized his trajectory as one moving "from being a combat veteran and teacher, to being a musician and filmmaker."

=== Public commentary ===
In May 2025, Barbe was quoted by NOTUS and other outlets in coverage of the combat record of U.S. Representative Cory Mills.

== Documentary work ==
Barbe's documentary work is associated with Echo Bravo Productions, a production company whose other projects include the feature documentary No Greater Love.

In 2020, Barbe co-founded the ongoing documentary series Do Good with chaplain Justin Roberts. The series profiles community-led recovery in the wake of natural disasters and conflicts. KPLC-TV in Lake Charles, Louisiana aired a "Hometown Heroes" feature on the project on April 8, 2021, reporting that the series began in response to Hurricane Laura, Hurricane Delta, and the February 2021 winter storm that had struck southwestern Louisiana in succession. The segment quotes Barbe on what he found on arrival: "I saw people looking for food, finding food and feeding their neighbors. I saw people hooking up generators for their next door neighbors. People with chain saws cutting trees off their neighbors' yards. I saw this world where everybody was doing good."

In 2023, Barbe spent approximately eight months in Ukraine producing a Do Good entry on the civilian impact of the Russo-Ukrainian War, under the working title Do Good Ukraine. KPLC-TV revisited the project in a follow-up "Hometown Heroes" segment by John Bridges in January 2024. Barbe described filming in residential neighborhoods near active fighting and meeting families sheltering long-term in railway cars: "All of the trains that were there were full of people, they had them set up like little apartments. There was a family there, they had kids and sleeping bags. They were there so long that they had their kids art hung up along the wall behind them. People were living in those subways because they were afraid."

The Do Good series has continued with additional entries since 2024.

In addition to Do Good, Barbe is credited as an executive producer on two Echo Bravo Productions documentary projects in production as of 2026: Chasing Fire, a short documentary about the personal toll of conflict-zone photojournalism (in postproduction); and Live Free.

== Discography ==
Albums and EPs (with Three Beards)

- Lessons Learned (EP, 2016, CBM Records)
- Everybody Loves a Parade (album, 2020)
- Blood Makes the Grass Grow (album, 2022)

Selected singles (with Three Beards)

- "3" (2018)
- "Thinking of You" (2022) — peak #96, Mediabase 7-Day Activator Chart, week ending March 5, 2022
- "Just a Little Bit" (2024)

== Filmography ==
Documentary series

- Do Good (2020–present) — co-creator, on-camera talent
  - Do Good Ukraine (2023–present) — producer, on-camera talent

Documentary films (in production, 2026)

- Chasing Fire — executive producer
- Live Free — executive producer
