= 327th Infantry Regiment =

327th Infantry Regiment 327th Glider Infantry Regiment 327th Airborne Infantry Regiment 327th Infantry Regiment
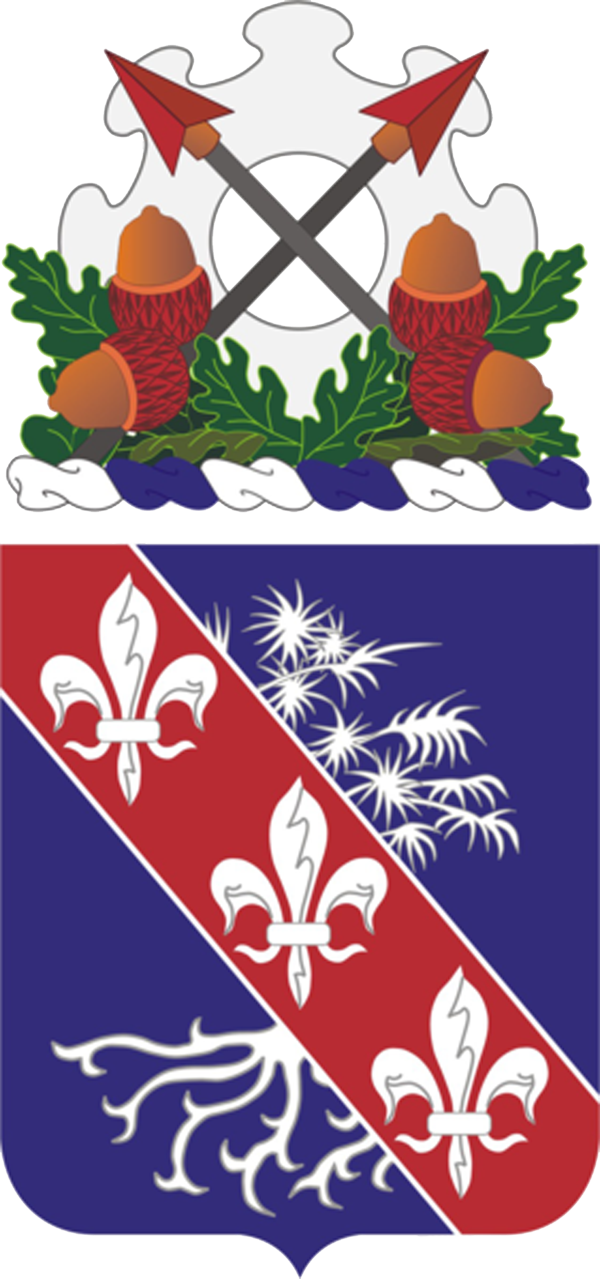
- 327th Infantry Regiment coat of arms
- Active: 1917–1919; 1921-1945; 1948–1953; 1954–
- Country: United States
- Branch: United States Army
- Type: Air assault infantry
- Size: Regiment
- Part of: 101st Airborne Division
- Garrison/HQ: Fort Campbell, Kentucky
- Nickname: "Bastogne Bulldogs" (BDE)(special designation)
- Mottos: "Honor and Country"
- Engagements: World War I; World War II; Operation Overlord; Operation Market Garden; Battle of the Bulge; Western Allied invasion of Germany; Vietnam War; Operation Desert Storm; Operation Iraqi Freedom; Operation Enduring Freedom

Commanders
- Ceremonial Chiefs: Colonel (Ret) Lou McDonald; CSM (Ret) Joe M. Bossi
- Notable commanders: Col. Joseph H. Harper 1944; Col. David Hackworth; Col. Charles A. Beckwith

Insignia
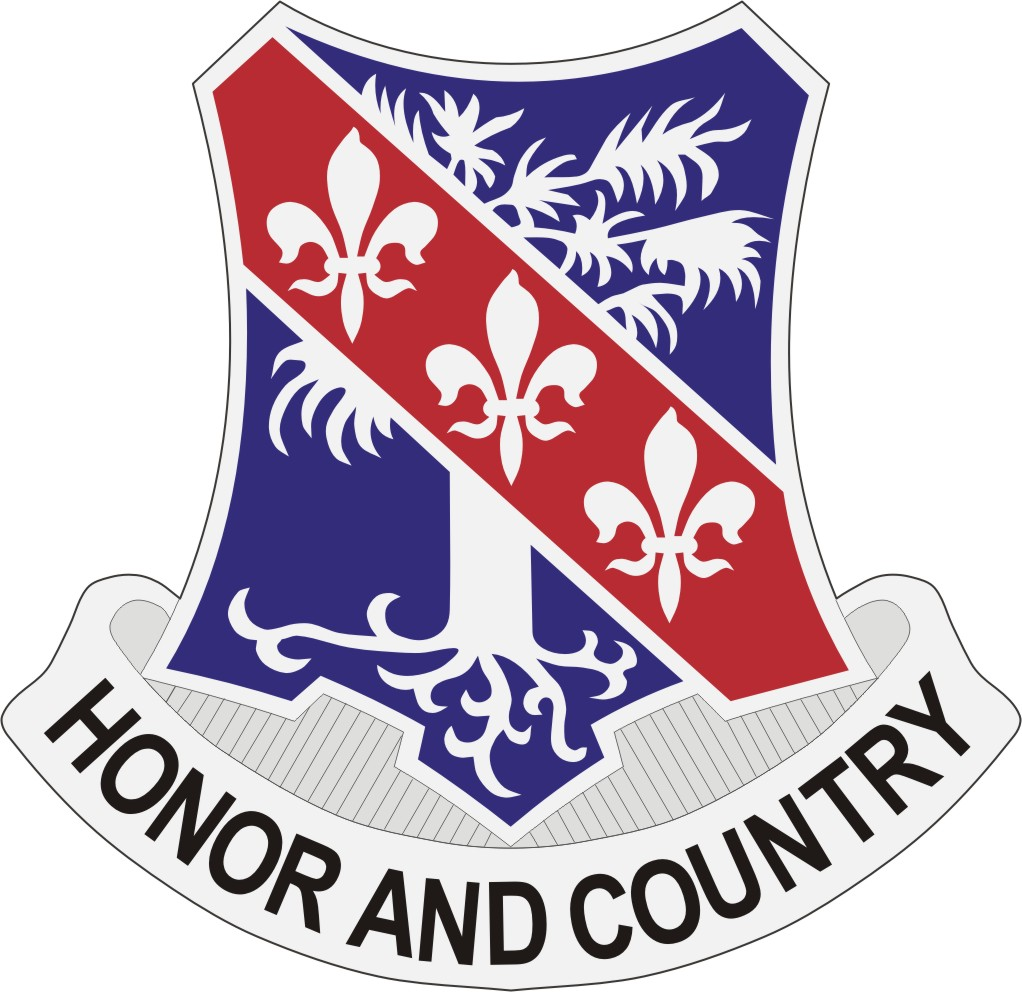
- Distinctive unit insignia

- Airborne background trimming for 1st and 2nd Battalions

- Organizational beret flashes for 1st and 2nd Battalions, worn on the Army black beret

The 327th Infantry Regiment (Bastogne Bulldogs) is an infantry regiment of the 101st Airborne Division (Air Assault) of the United States Army. During World War I it fought as part of the 82nd Division. In World War II, the 327th was a glider-borne regiment of the 101st Airborne Division. It has also been deployed in the Vietnam War, Gulf War, and most recently to Iraq and Afghanistan. The song "Glider Rider" describes (humorously) some of the slights that glider-borne troops felt they received from the Army during World War II; though the regiment's public fame rose with the 1949 movie Battleground about the Siege of Bastogne in late 1944.

== World War I ==
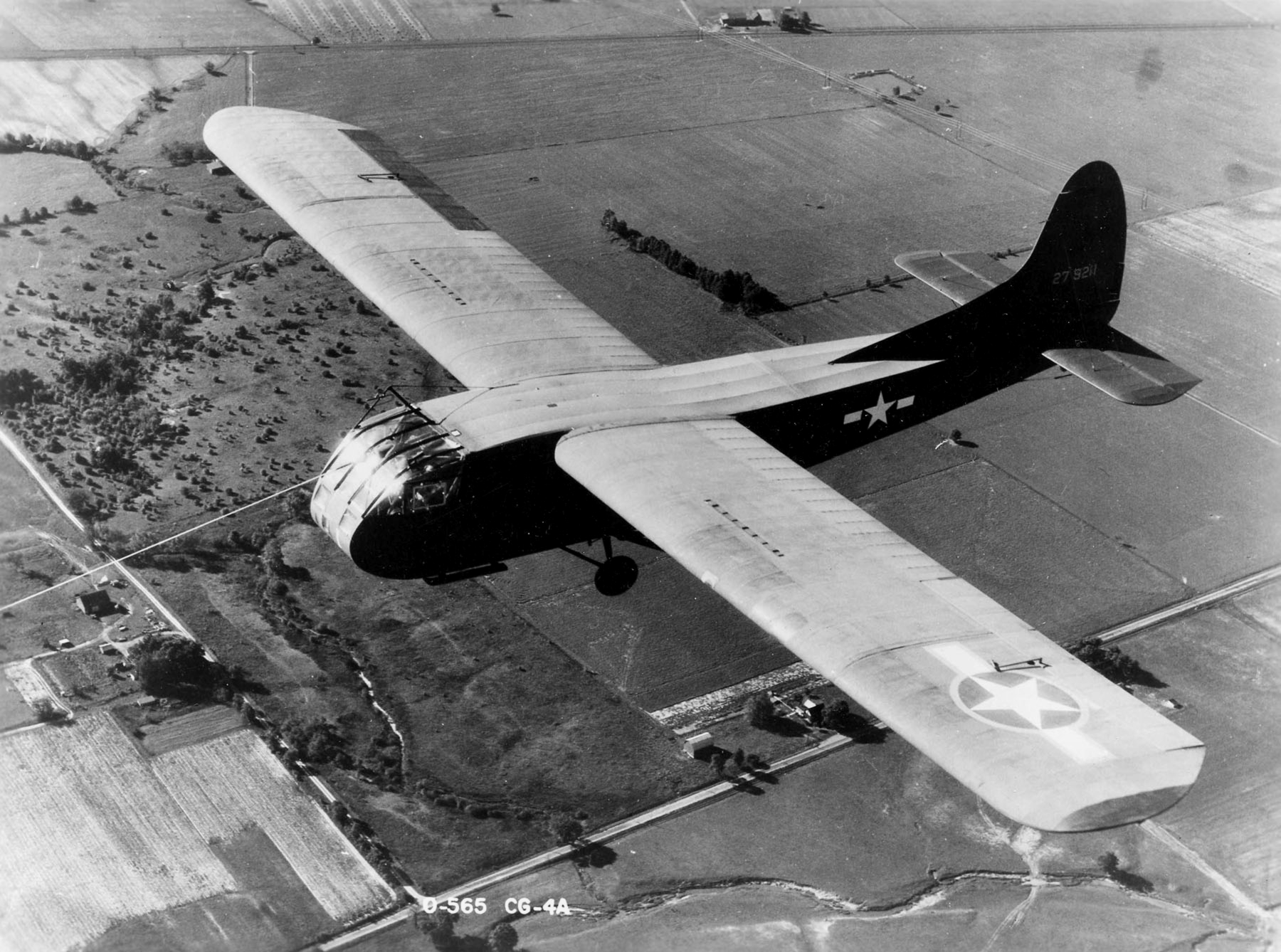

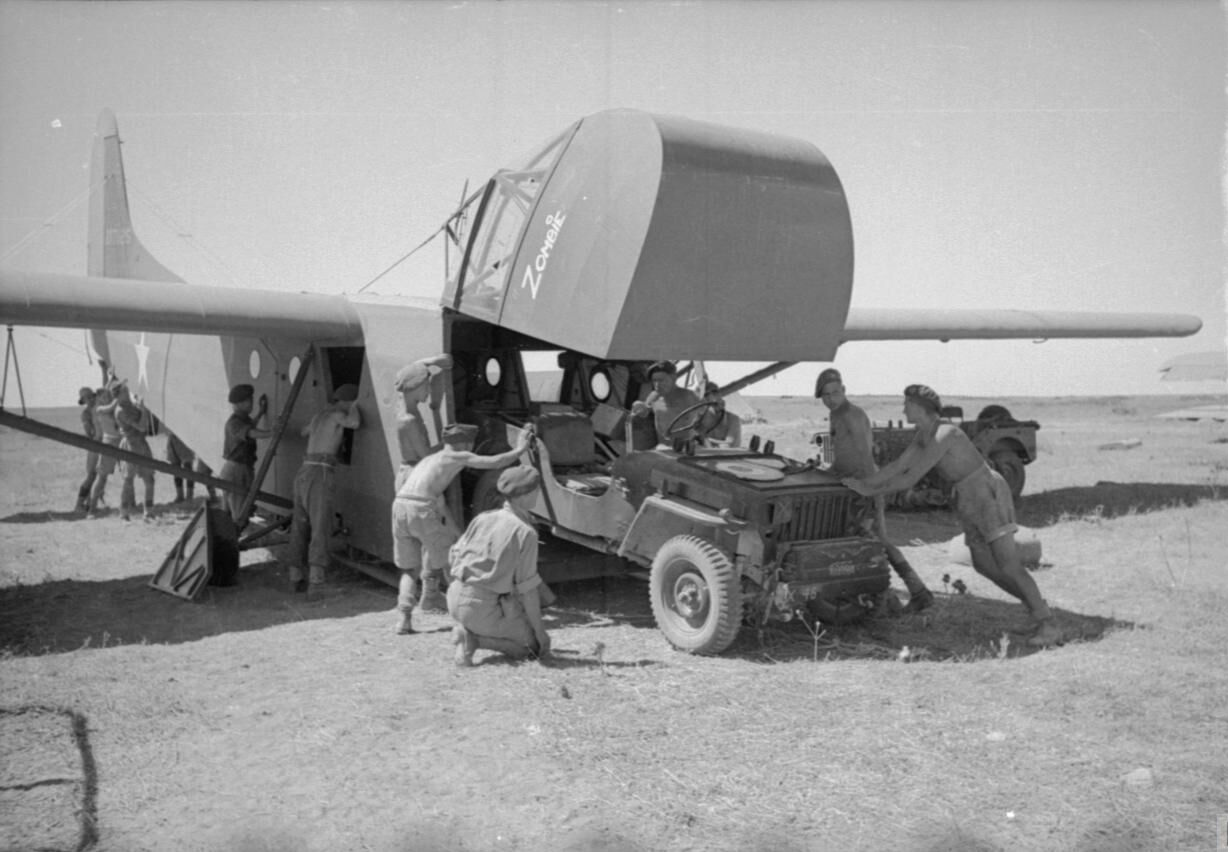
Jeep loading onto Waco glider.

In WWI the 327th Infantry Regiment served as part of the 164th Infantry Brigade in the 82nd Infantry Division. The 327th Infantry was organized on 15 September 1917 at Camp Gordon, Georgia. After training, the regiment embarked to northern France, arriving in early spring 1918. Elements of the 327th Infantry moved up to the front lines at the end of that summer. On 9 June 1918, Cpt Jewett Williams became the first man in the regiment killed in combat.

The 82nd Infantry Division's first exposure to combat, as a division, occurred on 25 June when it was assigned to the Lagney sector. While this was earmarked as a quiet sector, the 327th actively patrolled and executed raids for several weeks.

=== Saint-Mihiel ===
The 82nd Division was occupying the Marbache sector in the Moselle Valley with orders to protect the flank of attacking U.S. forces. But as the Germans were reinforcing this sector in anticipation of a coming Allied offensive, the Division ordered a series of raids to mislead the Germans on the exact location of attacking units. The 327th Infantry, conducted a raid on a German strongpoint known as the Bel Air Farm on 13 September with 2 companies, E and K, as the assault force. After initial success the assault group was pushed back to the original U.S. lines. E & K companies suffered 6 dead, 11 severely wounded, 69 wounded and 10 missing. The 82nd continued operations in Saint-Mihiel until, on 17 September, it was relieved by troops of the 90th Infantry Division just west of the Moselle River. The 82nd Division went into reserve to prepare for the Meuse-Argonne Offensive, but the 327th was attached to the 28th Division and remained on the front until early October.

=== Meuse-Argonne ===
The 82nd Division was given a new axis of advance early in the Meuse-Argonne Offensive to attack and fill a gap to the left flank of the 28th Infantry Division which was advancing to capture Hill 223 as part of operations to rescue the 77th Infantry Division's Lost Battalion. On the night of 6/7 October 1918, the regiment relieved troops on the left of the 28th Division on the Aire River. On 7 October, it attacked toward the Argonne Forest, making some progress toward Cornay. On 8 October rescuers reached the Lost Battalion. The next day the 327th continued to attack towards the high ground northwest of Châtel-Chéhéry. The 327th then continued to fight in the Ardennes region, capturing Cornay and Hill 180. On 4 November the regiment was pulled from the line and moved into training area; it was there when it learned of the 11 November Armistice.

The 327th Infantry suffered 331 killed in action, 73 died of wounds and 1959 wounded in the First World War. Members of the 327th were awarded 7 Distinguished Services Crosses (DSC), including one for the 2-327th Commander-Lt Col Harold W. Blanchard.

== Interwar period ==
The 327th Infantry arrived at the port of New York on 19 May 1919 on the USS Walter A. Luckenbach and was demobilized on 26 May 1919 at Camp Upton, New York. It was reconstituted in the Organized Reserve on 24 June 1921, assigned to the 82nd Division, and allotted to the Fourth Corps Area. The regiment was initiated on 7 December 1921 with headquarters at Greenville, South Carolina. Subordinate battalion headquarters were concurrently organized as follows: 1st Battalion at Columbia, South Carolina; 2nd Battalion at Spartanburg, South Carolina; and the 3rd Battalion at Florence, South Carolina. The regimental band was organized in 1926 at Greenville under the leadership of Warrant Officer A.J. Garing, who had spent sixteen years in the United States Marine Band under John Philip Sousa. The regiment conducted summer training most years with the 22nd Infantry Regiment at Fort McPherson, Georgia, and some years with the 8th Infantry Regiment at Fort Moultrie, South Carolina, or Fort Screven, Georgia. The regiment also conducted infantry Citizens Military Training Camps some years at Fort Moultrie or Fort Screven as an alternate form of summer training. The primary ROTC "feeder" schools for new Reserve lieutenants for the regiment were Clemson Agricultural College in Clemsom and The Citadel Military College of South Carolina in Charleston.

== World War II ==
=== Initial training ===
The 82nd Infantry Division was ordered into active military service on 25 March 1942 at Camp Claiborne, Louisiana. On 15 August 1942, the 82nd Infantry Division was reorganized and redesignated as the 82nd Airborne Division, one of the U.S. Army's first two airborne divisions. The 82nd Airborne Division provided the cadre for the 101st Airborne Division, which was activated on the same day, and the 327th Infantry Regiment was reassigned to the 101st and reorganized as a glider infantry regiment. All equipment and personnel assigned to the regiment were designed to be carried in the Waco CG-4A glider.

=== Normandy ===
Although a glider infantry regiment, the majority of the 327th landed by sea on Utah Beach in the afternoon of 7 June 1944, because of a shortage of planes to tow its gliders. Some elements did reach shore on D-Day, 6 June, but because of rough seas, beach traffic, and the fact that the paratroopers of the 101st had already achieved many of their objectives, the landing was delayed. The 327th suffered a few casualties going ashore from enemy fire and were strafed by enemy aircraft. Near Saint-Côme-du-Mont (southeast of the village), the 327th was camped right next to German paratroopers, separated by thick hedgerows. German-speaking soldiers in the 327th engaged in taunting the enemy. The 327th took several casualties by enemy mortars. By 8 June, the 327th had entered the front line, largely in reserve of the 506th until crossing the Douve River near Carentan. First and Second Battalions guarded Utah Beachhead's left flank northeast of Carentan. Company C was hit hard by friendly fire mortars while crossing the Douve. Official findings blamed enemy mines. Company B also suffered casualties in the incident.

The 327th suffered heavy casualties while advancing on Carentan via what is now the city Marina from a northeast direction and other casualties approaching Carentan from the east. G Company led the attack on the west bank of the marina canal. A Company of the attached 401st Glider Infantry Regiment was on the east bank of the canal. Concealed German machine guns and mortars inflicted the most casualties. Chaplain Gordon Cosby earned a Silver Star for bravery in the face of the enemy for assisting wounded glider men in front of heavily armed German soldiers. The 327th played a pivotal role with the 501st and 506th of the 101st in taking Carentan. The 327th marched through the town and East to be possibly the first unit of the Utah Beachhead to link up with the Omaha Beachhead around the four-villages area of le Fourchette, le Mesnil, le Rocher and Cotz. It was then directed South between the bulk of the 101st and the 75th Infantry Division of the Omaha Beachhead.

The unit was commanded by Col. George S. Wear through 10 June, when command was turned over to Col. Joseph H. Harper. Although not official, the men of the 327th understood that Wear was replaced because of friendly-fire artillery casualties while crossing the Douve River. Officially, enemy mortars were blamed.

=== The Netherlands ===
The regiment played a pivotal role in Operation Market Garden battle near Best, in the Netherlands, encircling a large German force which had been pressured from the west by the tank-supported 502nd of the 101st. Sgt. Manuel Hidalgo and Lt. Hibbard of G Company risked their lives in a humanitarian effort to get the enemy to surrender before being annihilated by the 327th. In the Market Garden operations, some companies in the 327th suffered two-thirds casualty rates before arriving at Opheusden. 2nd Battalion, especially Company G, suffered heavy casualties from a brutal shelling in the churchyard at Veghel. The large artillery shells were launched from the Erp vicinity. Dutch collaborators aided German scouts and were executed by the Dutch underground after the shelling.

At Opheusden, the 327th withstood repeated assaults by the enemy and heavy artillery barrages. In Rendezvous with Destiny, Rapport and Arthur cite British officers that indicated that the barrage suffered by the 327 was as intense as anything they had seen, and rivaled what the British pummeled the Germans with at El Alamein in North Africa. The fighting along the west and northwest perimeter in the Ophuesden (the Island) area was as intense as any fighting in the area. E Company engaged in hand-to-hand combat with the enemy near the railroad track switch house south of Opheusden. The enemy repeatedly hurled their units unsuccessfully at the glider men and suffered high casualties.

=== Bastogne ===
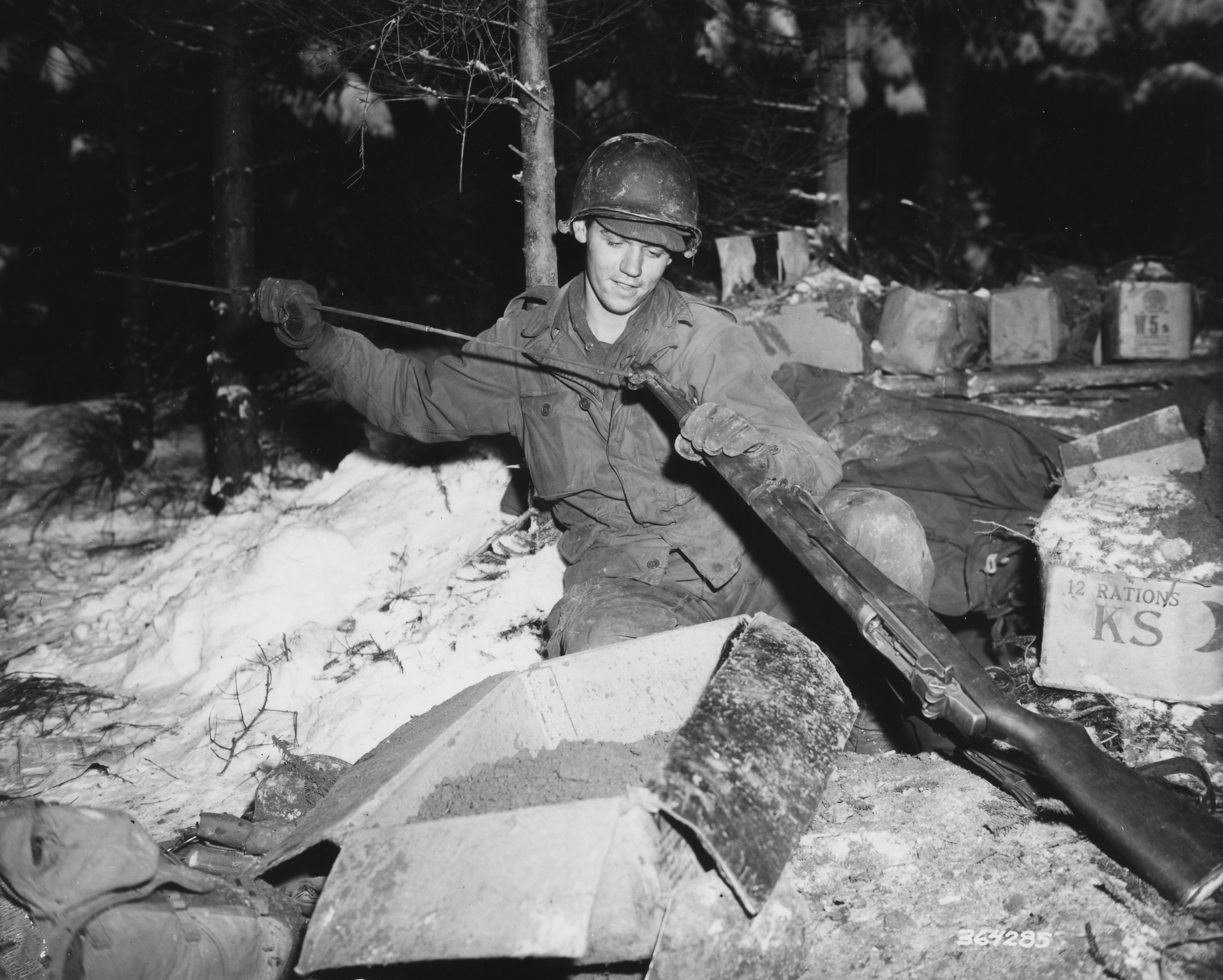
PFC William J. Ottersbach of 3rd Battalion, 327th cleans his rifle during a break near Foy. 11 January, 1945.

At Bastogne, Belgium, the 327 held half of the perimeter (including the 401, which was acting as the Regiment's 3rd Battalion and later officially became a part of the 327). Numerous intense fights erupted along the 327 sector including two brutal fights at Marvie and more to the west in the 401 section. The Germans attacking were of the Volksgrenadiers and the elite tank-based Panzer Lehr. At Marvie the 327 was outnumbered by 15 to 1. Facing only two US companies, G Company, supported by several tanks from the 10th Armored Division and E Company in reserve, the German commander took his whole division further west. At Marvie, the Germans lost six tanks and several half tracks. One tank did break into Marvie, but was destroyed trying to make a run towards Bastogne. Several days later, during the night of 23 December, the enemy attacked in force with tanks. The road through Marvie was blocked when G Company mistook a US tank destroyer for a German tank and destroyed it on the village bridge. The Germans overran Hill 500 just to the west of Marvie and broke through the gap between F and G Company. The enemy then put rear pressure on the F Company Command Post. A platoon sized paratrooper element came to support F Company. The German forces managed to place tanks behind US lines between Marvie and Bastogne. The glider men of Company G and Company F were pushed back from 500 to 1,000 yards during the intense fighting, but did not break. Unable to make quick progress, the Germans pressed the attack until morning, but withdrew when the German Command Center was destroyed by US artillery. Again, the 327 was badly outnumbered by the enemy.

After the break through by General Patton's tanks, the 327th proceeded to the north sector of the Bastogne theater of operations. There, 2nd Battalion was involved in clearing Champs after a German armored element broke through paratrooper lines. Companies A and C suffered intense casualties and were consolidated into one company call ACE. Later, the 327 made an open field maneuver against armored enemy troops east of Foy, which helped secure that village. The ferocity and speed of the open-field attack surprised the Germans and the paratrooper regiments on the flanks of the attack. German forces attacked the flank and surrounded ACE Company in Bois Jacques. After that, the enemy was primarily in withdrawal mode back to Germany.

Like other Glider regiments of the era, the 327 is sometimes overlooked by histography of the 101st Airborne Division and the North-west Europe Campaign. Several companies of the 327 suffered casualty rates comparable to other paratroop regiments. On D+2, glider flights into Market Garden suffered a 30% loss of gliders. Later, the 327 was involved in action near Haguenau in the Alsace.

== Post WWII ==
Inactivated on 30 November 1945 in France, the regiment was redesignated as the 516th Airborne Infantry Regiment on 18 June 1948 and active from 6 July 1948 to 1 April 1949 and from 25 August 1950 to 1 December 1953 at Camp Breckinridge, Kentucky. As was the case with many combat divisions of World War II fame, the colors of the 101st Airborne Division and its subordinate elements were active only as training units and were not organized as parachute or glider units.

On 27 April 1954 the 516th was relieved from assignment to the 101st Airborne Division and activated at Fort Jackson, South Carolina, on 15 May 1954, again as a training unit. On 1 July 1956 it was reorganized and redesignated as the 327th Airborne Infantry Regiment, an element of the 101st. On 25 April 1957 the colors of Company A, 327AIR were reorganized and redesignated as HHC, 1st Airborne Battle Group, 327th Infantry, and remained assigned to the 101st Airborne Division (organic elements concurrently constituted and activated). This was the only active element of the 327th Infantry during the Pentomic era. When the Army abandoned battle groups for brigades and battalions, the unit was reorganized and redesignated on 3 February 1963 as the 1st Battalion, 327th Infantry, an element of the 1st Brigade, 101st Airborne Division.

On 21 January 1964 the lineage of the former Company B, 327AIR was redesignated as HHC, 2d Battalion, 327th Infantry, assigned to the 101st Airborne Division (organic elements concurrently constituted) and activated on 3 February 1963, also as an element of the 1st Brigade, 101st Airborne Division.

== Vietnam ==
As elements of the 1st Brigade, the 1st and 2nd Battalions 327th Infantry deployed to South Vietnam on 29 July 1965, where they were joined by the rest of the division in late 1967.

In November 1965 Major David Hackworth organized Tiger Force a platoon-sized long-range reconnaissance patrol unit within the 1st Battalion. Tiger Force was later accused of extensive war crimes against South Vietnamese civilians.

In October 1968 the 1st Battalion was awarded the Presidential Unit Citation by President Lyndon B. Johnson.

On 28 November 1971 a CH-47 carrying five crew and 28 soldiers from the Regiment on a flight from Da Nang to Phu Bai Combat Base crashed into high ground, killing all aboard.

The 2nd Battalion was the longest serving battalion in combat operations during the Vietnam War, fighting continuously from July 1965 until its return to Fort Campbell in April 1972, and suffering over 300 soldiers killed. The battalion's motto, "No Slack," was coined by 1st Sergeant Raymond E. Benson, who was killed in action on 23 April 1967.

== Post-war reorganization ==
Former beret flashes of the 327th Infantry

C Company, 4th Battalion, 327th Infantry

C Company, 5th Battalion, 327th Infantry

C Company, 6th Battalion, 327th Infantry

During the early 1980s the army adopted a battalion rotation program that paired combat battalions based in the continental United States with those stationed overseas. As part of this program, the lineage of the former Company C, 327AIR was redesignated on 21 January 1983 as HHC, 3d Battalion, 327th Infantry, and assigned to the 1st Brigade, 101st Airborne Division (Air Assault). This was accomplished by reflagging the existing 2nd Battalion, 502nd Infantry. In Alaska the existing infantry battalions of the 172nd Infantry Brigade were reflagged as the 4th, 5th and 6th Battalions, 327th Infantry, with the three "C" companies' back on airborne status, thus reactivating the lineages of the former companies D, E, and F, 327AIR. The rotational program was later abandoned and the Alaska-based battalions were reflagged again, leaving only the Fort Campbell-based battalions with 327th designations.

When the 172nd Infantry Brigade (Separate) was inactivated and replaced by the newly re-activated 6th Infantry Division (Light) in 1986; the 4th, 5th and 6th Battalions, 327th Infantry were also inactivated and replaced by the 1st and 2nd Battalion, 17th Infantry (Fort Richardson, AK); and the 4th and 5th Battalion, 9th Infantry (Fort Wainwright, AK).

== Operation Desert Storm ==
In 1990 the 1st BCT (including the 1st, 2nd and 3rd Battalions of the 327th) was deployed to Saudi Arabia during Operation Desert Shield. The 1st BCT established defensive positions north of Tap Line Road approximately 60 miles (97 km) south of the Iraq border. On 17 January the 327th Infantry Regiment conducted a ground movement to Camp Eagle II in preparation for deployment into Iraq. Over the course of the next week the regiment regrouped and by C-130 and ground convey repositioned to RaFa in northern Saudi Arabia and further into TAA Campbell where it remained for approximately 30 days. With the commencement of ground operations, under the command of Colonel Tom Hill the 327th conducted the deepest and largest air assault operation in history establishing FOB Cobra approximately 85 miles (137 km) inside Iraq. Subordinate elements were 1st Battalion, 327th Infantry Battalion commanded by LTC Frank R Hancock, 2nd Battalion, 327th commanded by LTC Charles Garey Thomas, 3rd Battalion 327th commanded by LTC (P) Gary J. Bridges and 1st Battalion 502nd commanded by LTC Jim Donald. 2nd Battalion 320 FA artillery was commanded by LTC Lynn Hartsell. The 3rd Battalion, 327th Infantry Regiment conducted a second air assault operation to seize FOB Viper under the command of 2nd Brigade 101st Airborne Division for further seal the defeat of Iraqi forces. Not a single 101st Airborne Division soldier was lost. For its actions at FOB Cobra the 1-327th was award the Valorous Unit Award.

== Operation Iraqi Freedom ==
In early 2003 the entire 101st Airborne Division deployed to Kuwait in support of Operation Iraqi Freedom where the 1st Brigade Combat Team made up of the 327th Infantry Regiment under the command of Colonel Ben Hodges and its support elements prepared for battle at Camp Pennsylvania. The majority of the 327th Infantry Regiment later shifted to Camp Udairi, Kuwait and from there, conducted a massive air assault into southern Iraq while other soldiers crossed the Kuwaiti-Iraqi border in a massive maneuver known as a GAC, or Ground Assault Convoy. Once in Iraq, the 327th encountered heavy to light resistance from both fleeing Iraqi soldiers as well as the Fedayeen Saddam and other less organized fighters. The 327th, under LTC Edmund Palekas, fought through An Najaf, Al Kufa, Karbala, Baghdad, and then headed north to conduct Stability and Security Operations in Qayyarah West and Mosul or Al Mawsil.

While deployed in Mosul, Iraq, 3-327 was attached to 2nd Brigade, 502nd, when they killed Saddam Hussein’s sons, Uday and Qusay Hussein. This was Operation Tapeworm in which 3-327 led the isolation and containment of the objective in support of TF Delta.

They returned to the U.S. in early 2004 and were re-deployed to Iraq again in the fall of 2005. During their second tour in Iraq, they were stationed in the Kirkuk province under the command of LTC Marc Hutson and CSM David Allard. The majority of the 1st Brigade Combat Team were positioned on FOB Warrior at the Kirkuk Regional Air Base while 1st Battalion and other attachments were spread out amongst FOB McHenry outside of Hawijah, FOB Caldwell just south of Kirkuk, and FOB Bernstien southwest of Kirkuk.

For their third OIF deployment, the Bastogne Bulldogs were split up, with the 1st Battalion deployed near Baiji, Iraq, and the 2nd Battalion deployed in the vicinity of Samarra, Iraq. Both battalions served 15 month deployments beginning in September 2007, and ending in late November 2008.

=== Modularity ===
With the recent Army-wide reorganization adding one brigade to each division and eliminating one infantry or armor battalion from each brigade, 3-327th was inactivated and replaced by the 1st Squadron (RSTA), 32nd Cavalry Regiment. The 1st Brigade Combat Team, 101st Airborne Division (Air Assault) also includes the 1st Battalion, 506th Infantry regiment; 2nd Battalion, 320th Field Artillery Regiment; the 426th Brigade Support Battalion; and the 326th Brigade Engineer Battalion.

== War in Afghanistan (2001–2014) ==
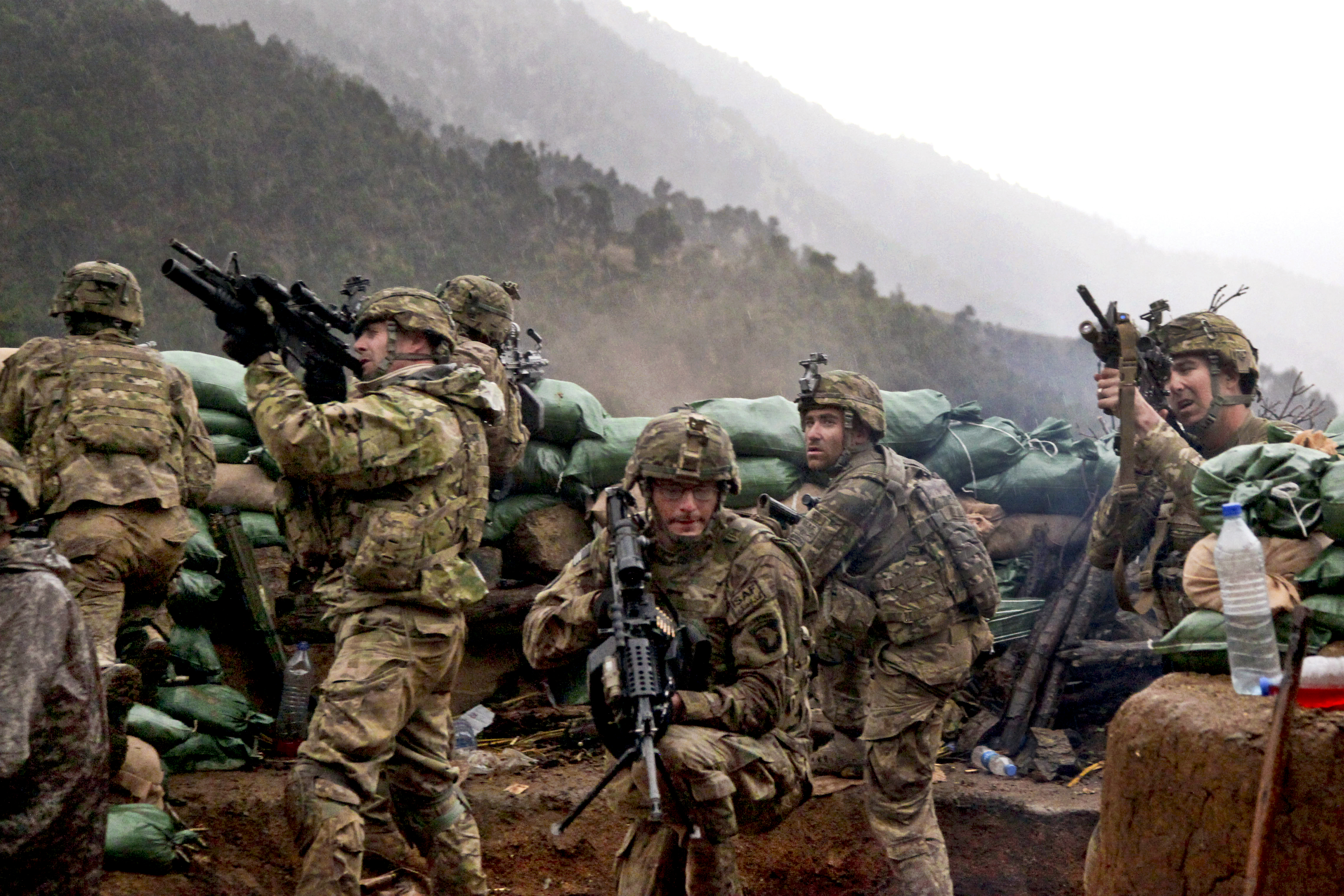
U.S. Soldiers with 2nd Battalion, 327th Infantry Regiment, 101st Airborne Division return fire during a firefight with Taliban forces in Barawala Kalay Valley in Kunar province, Afghanistan, 31 March 2011

The 2nd Battalion, 327th Infantry Regiment, 101st Airborne Division conducted a major combat operation in Barawala Kalay Valley, Kunar Province, Afghanistan in late March–April 2011. It is known as the Battle of Barawala Kalay Valley. It was an operation to close down the Taliban supply route through the Barawala Kalay Valley and to remove the forces of Taliban warlord Qari Ziaur Rahman from the Barwala Kalay Valley. The 2nd Battalion, 327th Infantry Regiment, 101st Airborne Division would suffer 6 killed and 7 wounded during combat operations. It would inflict over 100 casualties on the Taliban and successfully close down the Taliban supply route. ABC News correspondent Mike Boettcher was on scene and he called it the fiercest fighting he has ever seen in his 30 years of being in war zones.

== Post-GWOT ==
1BCT, 101st Airborne Division deployed to the EUCOM AOR in March of 2023 in support of Operation European Assure, Deter and Reinforce in wake of Russia's invasion of Ukraine organized under V Corps and 10th Mountain Division.

== Lineage ==
- Constituted 5 August 1917 in the National Army as the 327th Infantry and assigned to the 82d Division
- Organized 17 September 1917 at Camp Gordon, at Augusta, Georgia.
- Demobilized 26 May 1919 at Camp Upton, at Yaphank, New York.
- Reconstituted 24 June 1921 in the Organized Reserves as the 327th Infantry and assigned to the 82d Division
- Organized in December 1921 with headquarters at Greenville, South Carolina.
- Ordered into active military service 25 March 1942 and reorganized at Camp Claiborne, at Forest Hill, Louisiana.
- Reorganized and redesignated 15 August 1942 as the 327th Glider Infantry; concurrently relieved from assignment to the 82d Division and assigned to the 101st Airborne Division
- (3d Battalion consolidated 6 April 1945 with the 1st Battalion, 401st Glider Infantry [see ANNEX], and consolidated unit designated as the 3d Battalion, 327th Glider Infantry)
- Inactivated 30 November 1945 in France
- (Organized Reserves redesignated 25 March 1948 as the Organized Reserve Corps)
- Redesignated 18 June 1948 as the 516th Airborne Infantry
- Withdrawn 25 June 1948 from the Organized Reserve Corps and allotted to the Regular Army
- (1st Battalion inactivated 1 April 1949 at Camp Breckinridge, at Morganfield, Kentucky)
- Regiment (less 1st Battalion) inactivated 22 April 1949 at Camp Breckinridge, Kentucky
- Regiment activated 25 August 1950 at Camp Breckinridge, Kentucky
- Inactivated 1 December 1953 at Camp Breckinridge, Kentucky
- Relieved 27 April 1954 from assignment to the 101st Airborne Division
- Activated 15 May 1954 at Fort Jackson, at Columbia, South Carolina.
- Reorganized and redesignated 1 July 1956 as the 327th Airborne Infantry and assigned to the 101st Airborne Division
- Relieved 25 April 1957 from assignment to the 101st Airborne Division; concurrently reorganized and redesignated as the 327th Infantry, a parent regiment under the U.S. Army Combat Arms Regimental System
- Withdrawn 21 January 1983 from the Combat Arms Regimental System and reorganized under the United States Army Regimental System

== 401st Infantry (Annex) ==
Initially, American airborne divisions were organized on paper with one parachute infantry regiment and two, two-battalion glider infantry regiments. The 101st Airborne Division had the 327th and 401st Glider Infantry. When the TO&E for airborne divisions was changed to encompass a single three-battalion glider regiment, the 2nd Battalion of the 401st was transferred to the 82nd Airborne Division to form the 3rd Battalion of the 325th Glider Infantry Regiment, while the 1st Battalion of the 401st stayed with the 101st and was used to form the 3rd Battalion of the 327th. This battalion was sea-landed in the Normandy invasion, glider-landed during Operation Market Garden and moved by truck to participate in the Battle of the Bulge.

=== Lineage ===
- Constituted 23 July 1918 in the National Army as the 1st Battalion, 401st Infantry, an element of the 101st Division
- Demobilized 30 November 1918
- Reconstituted 24 June 1921 in the Organized Reserves as the 1st Battalion, 401st Infantry, an element of the 101st Division
- Organized in November 1921 with headquarters at Milwaukee, Wisconsin.
- Disbanded 15 August 1942; concurrently reconstituted in the Army of the United States as the 1st Battalion, 401st Glider Infantry, an element of the 101st Airborne Division, and activated at Camp Claiborne, Louisiana
- Disbanded 1 March 1945 in France and the personnel and equipment designated and constituted as the 3rd Battalion, 327th Glider Infantry.
- Reconstituted 6 April 1945 in the Army of the United States as the 1st Battalion, 401st Glider Infantry; concurrently consolidated with the 3d Battalion, 327th Glider Infantry, and consolidated unit designated as the 3d Battalion, 327th Glider Infantry, an element of the 101st Airborne Division

== Honors ==
=== Campaign participation credit ===
- World War I
1. Saint-Mihiel;
2. Meuse-Argonne;
3. Lorraine 1918
- World War II:
1. Normandy (with arrowhead);
2. Rhineland (with arrowhead);
3. Ardennes-Alsace;
4. Central Europe
- Vietnam War:
1. Defense;
2. Counteroffensive;
3. Counteroffensive, Phase II;
4. Counteroffensive, Phase III;
5. Tet Counteroffensive;
6. Counteroffensive, Phase IV;
7. Counteroffensive, Phase V;
8. Counteroffensive, Phase VI;
9. Tet 69/Counteroffensive;
10. Summer-Fall 1969;
11. Winter-Spring 1970;
12. Sanctuary Counteroffensive;
13. Counteroffensive, Phase VII;
14. Consolidation I;# Iraq Surge
15. Afghanistan Consolidation III
16. Consolidation II;
17. Cease-Fire
- Southwest Asia Operation Desert Storm:
1. Defense of Saudi Arabia;
2. Liberation and Defense of Kuwait
- War on terror:
1. Iraq Surge;
2. Afghanistan Consolidation III

Additional campaigns to be determined

=== Decorations ===
1. Presidential Unit Citation (Army) for BASTOGNE
2. Presidential Unit Citation (Army) for DAK TO, VIETNAM 1966
3. Presidential Unit Citation (Army) for TRUNG LUONG
4. Valorous Unit Award for TUY HOA
5. Valorous Unit Award for SOUTHWEST ASIA
6. Valorous Unit Award for IRAQ (An Najaf 2003)
7. Meritorious Unit Commendation (Army) for VIETNAM 1965–1966
8. Meritorious Unit Commendation (Army) for SOUTHWEST ASIA
9. Meritorious Unit Commendation (Army) for IRAQ (OIF I)
10. Meritorious Unit Commendation (Army) for IRAQ (OIF VI October 2008 – November 2009)
11. Meritorious Unit Commendation (Army) for AFGHANISTAN (OEF 10–11)
12. French Croix de Guerre with Palm, World War II for NORMANDY
13. Belgium Croix de Guerre with Palm for BASTOGNE; cited in the Order of the Day of the Belgian Army for action at BASTOGNE
14. Belgian Fourragere 1940; Cited in the Order of the Day of the Belgian Army for action in FRANCE AND BELGIUM
15. Republic of Vietnam Cross of Gallantry with Palm, Streamer embroidered VIETNAM 1966-1967
16. Republic of Vietnam Cross of Gallantry with Palm, Streamer embroidered VIETNAM 1968-1969
17. Republic of Vietnam Cross of Gallantry with Palm, Streamer embroidered VIETNAM 1971
18. Republic of Vietnam Civil Action Honor Medal, First Class, Streamer embroidered VIETNAM 1968-1970

== In popular culture ==
The regiment was depicted in the 1949 film Battleground starring Van Johnson and John Hodiak. The film is renowned for its faithful depiction of American soldiers as they were during the war, including their bravery and vulnerabilities. A more controversial depiction of the 2nd Battalion "No Slack" is visible in the 1987 film "Hamburger Hill" depicting the 1969 campaign in the A Shau Valley of South Vietnam. The 2nd Battalion's 2010–2011 deployment to Kunar Province, Afghanistan, is the subject of the documentary No Greater Love, which was filmed during the deployment by the battalion's chaplain, Justin Roberts, and given a limited United States theatrical release in November 2017.
