= No Greater Love (2015 film) =

2015 American documentary film

- Directed by: Justin D. Roberts
- Written by: Justin D. Roberts; Alan Wain; (Note: The distributor's press kit credits Roberts and Wain under "Narration Written by"; the production notes accompanying it list Roberts alone as writer. The American Press reported that Roberts co-wrote the film without naming a co-writer.)
- Produced by: Justin D. Roberts; Harmon Kaslow; John Aglialoro; Brent Dones; Priyank E. Desai
- Cinematography: Ryan Curtis
- Edited by: Alan Wain; Jake T. Meaux
- Music by: Marc Vanocur
- Distributed by: Atlas Distribution Company
- Release dates: 2015 (Boston Film Festival); November 10, 2017 (U.S.)
- Running time: 97 minutes (Note: Published running times differ. The Washington Post and the film's press kit give 97 minutes; the Los Angeles Times, the San Diego Reader, LA Weekly and the GI Film Festival give 94 minutes.)
- Country: United States
- Language: English

No Greater Love is a 2015 American documentary film directed and produced by Justin D. Roberts, a former United States Army chaplain, who wrote it with Alan Wain. It combines video that Roberts recorded while deployed to Kunar Province, Afghanistan, in 2010 and 2011 with the 2nd Battalion, 327th Infantry Regiment of the 101st Airborne Division, a unit known as "No Slack", with interviews he conducted after the deployment with members of the battalion, their families, and the families of soldiers who were killed. The film screened at festivals from 2015 and won Best Documentary at the Boston Film Festival that year; Atlas Distribution Company gave it a limited United States theatrical release on November 10, 2017.

== Synopsis ==
No Greater Love intercuts combat footage recorded in Kunar Province with interviews conducted after the battalion returned to the United States, in which members of the unit discuss the events shown on camera. Officers describe the mountain terrain of the province, where visibility was limited and routes of withdrawal were few, and most of the film follows two missions in which the battalion took heavy casualties.

Interview subjects describe firefights, wounds and the deaths of members of the unit, and several return to duty before fully recovering from earlier injuries. Variety wrote that one soldier recalls treating a wounded insurgent responsible for an improvised explosive device that had killed a friend, and that another describes being haunted by his decision not to fire pre-emptively on a woman who then detonated an explosive vest.

The film deals with the return home: post-traumatic stress disorder, depression, divorce, difficulty readjusting to civilian life, and the rate of suicide among service members and veterans. It also includes interviews with Gold Star family members.

== Production ==
Roberts served six years on active duty as a United States Army chaplain and was assigned to the 2nd Battalion, 327th Infantry Regiment, 1st Brigade Combat Team, 101st Airborne Division, based at Fort Campbell, Kentucky. He has said that in his first months with the unit a soldier died by suicide on his second day in the assignment, followed by further suicides and by weekly suicidal ideation, gestures or attempts, and that the battalion's response was to build relationships within the unit rather than rely on formal briefings.

The battalion deployed to Kunar Province in 2010 for a year-long tour during the war in Afghanistan. Chaplains in the United States military are unarmed, including in combat. Roberts told Military Times, "I couldn't carry a weapon, so I asked if I could carry a camera." He has written that he sought permission from the battalion commander, Lieutenant Colonel J. B. Vowell, before doing so. Roberts held a master's degree in media arts and communication from Dallas Theological Seminary.

Roberts told Military Times that filming was not the purpose of his patrols and that the object was to be present with the unit: "Them being transparent, that takes a lot of courage. And that's not because I was a great interviewer. I suck as a journalist." In a 2016 interview he said he had begun with "this loose idea of doing a documentary, but not full, and definitely not this", and had initially photographed soldiers so that their families could follow them online, which in turn opened lines of communication for counselling.

Of the battalion's roughly 800 soldiers, 18 were killed in action, and more than 200 Purple Hearts were awarded over the deployment. Roberts left the Army in 2015; Variety reported that he was dealing with depression and post-traumatic stress disorder in the period before his departure and that he sought out members of his former unit partly to understand his own condition. Post-deployment interviews with soldiers and with the families of those killed were combined with the combat footage.

Roberts brought in producer Brent Dones, who had worked on the 2014 Afghanistan documentary The Hornet's Nest, which covered the same deployment. The film's title is taken from John 15:13.

== Release ==
No Greater Love began screening at film festivals in 2015. The American Press of Lake Charles and the Southwest Daily News of Sulphur, Louisiana, reported in October 2015 that it had won Best Documentary and the Mass Impact Award at the Boston Film Festival and Best Military Film at the San Diego Film Festival, and that it had been accepted by festivals in Lake Charles, Napa Valley, Kansas and Rehoboth Beach. It screened at the Lake Charles Film Festival in Louisiana on October 10, 2015, at the GI Film Festival in Washington, D.C., in 2016, and at community screenings such as one at the Lake Charles Civic Center in July 2016; it was also honored at the Beaufort International Film Festival in February 2016. Roberts said in 2016 that the film had also been screened for the House Committee on Veterans' Affairs.

On October 17, 2017, Atlas Distribution Company announced that it had signed the film to an exclusive United States theatrical distribution deal. Atlas president Harmon Kaslow said the film "presents a side of war rarely explored in film – the difficult journey back". Atlas and its publicists promoted the film as the first theatrical documentary directed by an active-duty soldier in combat; Military Times attributed that description to the film's marketing materials rather than adopting it, and reported Roberts as saying that what distinguished the film was the willingness of the soldiers to speak.

The film opened on November 10, 2017, Veterans Day weekend, in a limited release that Military Times reported as covering Fort Benning, Georgia, Fort Bragg, North Carolina, and about a dozen other locations, among them a theater in Clarksville, Tennessee, where the battalion is based and where Roberts, other members of the battalion and Gold Star families were announced as attending. Screenings were paired with appearances by local veterans' service organizations. The film opened in New York City at Cinema Village on December 1, 2017.

== Reception ==
Joe Leydon of Variety called No Greater Love "a fascinating and heartfelt documentary about members of a storied U.S. Army battalion and their experiences during 2010-11 deployment in Afghanistan", and wrote that Roberts "skillfully interweaves his video with postwar interviews". Leydon wrote that the film "remains more hopeful than despairing, even when — maybe especially when — interviewees describe how far they had to fall before they admitted that they needed help", and described Roberts as "too honest a first-time filmmaker — quite possibly because his honesty is bolstered with first-hand experiences — to proffer facile answers".

Movieguide called the film "one of the most powerful, best documentaries ever made" and "a dramatic, compelling, redemptive documentary". The same review advised caution over profanity and combat violence.

Alan Zilberman of The Washington Post called it "a remarkable film about war and its effect on soldiers", and wrote that "[b]ecause the interview subjects in 'No Greater Love' speak without interruption, their recollections are all the more natural and vivid" and that the film "gets at the camaraderie — and the contradictions — of military service in a way that few films ever have". He was critical of its construction: "Despite his extraordinary access, Roberts is not a natural documentarian, using a sermon as an awkward framing device. Interviews often cut to him listening intently, which interrupts the flow of the stories."

Craig D. Lindsey wrote in The Village Voice that, set against the 2017 drama Thank You for Your Service, the documentary "presents a more authentic look at the lives of 21st-century war veterans, giving actual survivors a chance to talk about their experiences both during and after their deployments". He wrote that Roberts "didn't have a gun, but he did have a camera", and concluded: "But I'm thankful No Greater Love is around to make people realize how much war heroes need our love, help, and support once they come back home. Just telling them 'thank you for your service' ain't gonna cut it." A near-identical version of Lindsey's review, differing in minor copy edits, was published in LA Weekly on November 10, 2017.

Writing in the Los Angeles Times, Kimber Myers said there is "an inescapable sense of immediacy and real risk within 'No Greater Love'" and that the film "exists beyond politics and beyond religion, devoting its energy to story after story of bravery". She added that it "isn't always as technically proficient as the audience might want it to be — especially its sometimes distracting editing — but it's both effective and affecting in its emotionally raw narrative".

Matthew Lickona of the San Diego Reader wrote that the film treats the soldiers' eagerness to return to combat as more surprising than it is, and that a Gold Star widow who appears briefly, voicing dismay that her husband had been sent on a dangerous mission shortly before he was due home, is told that he had asked to go and is not heard from again on the point. He concluded: "Despite the sentimental soundtrack, the declarations of American greatness, and the stories of courage under fire, what mostly comes though [sic] is that war is hell, and it takes an awful toll on those who wage it."

The Tragedy Assistance Program for Survivors, which supports bereaved military families, wrote that the film "seeks to help others understand the experience of war and the personal struggles of soldiers", and cautioned that "[f]or some TAPS families, the battle footage may cause a significant emotional reaction and caution should be exercised".

== Accolades ==
Reporting the film's acquisition for theatrical release in October 2017, Deadline Hollywood wrote that it had by then won 11 awards; the American Press had reported the same total in June 2016.

Festival	Award	Result	Ref.
Boston Film Festival (2015)	Best Documentary	Won	
Boston Film Festival (2015)	Mass Impact Award	Won	
San Diego Film Festival (2015)	Best Military Film	Won	
Lake Charles Film Festival (2015)	Best of Show (Note: Mercer University's account names this award "Best of Show"; the American Press names it "Best of Fest". At the 2015 Lake Charles Film Festival "Best of the Fest" was also the name of a screening programme at which the winning films were shown.)	Won	
Lake Charles Film Festival (2015)	Best Documentary	Won	
Foyle Film Festival (2015)	Best Documentary (Note: Awarded jointly with The Mind of Mark DeFriest, directed by Gabriel London.)	Won	
Beaufort International Film Festival (2016)	Santini Patriot Spirit Award (Note: Presented to the film's director, Justin Roberts.)	Won	
Phoenix Film Festival (2016)	Cox Audience Award (Note: The festival's historical award roll lists the same award as the Phoenix Film Festival Audience Award; "Cox" was the sponsor name used in 2016.)	Won	
Louisiana International Film Festival (2016)	Best Documentary	Won	
Bentonville Film Festival (2016)	Best of the Fest (Note: The Arkansas Democrat-Gazette recorded the award as determined by audience ballot.)	Won	
GI Film Festival (2016)	Military Filmmaker Award (Note: The festival's award roll lists the Military Filmmaker Award under the film; Military Times reported that Roberts was named Best Military Filmmaker at the festival.)	Won	

The Santini Patriot Spirit Award is presented by the Beaufort Film Society for a film's portrayal of American service members, veterans or their families. It is named for Marine Corps Colonel Donald Conroy, nicknamed "the Great Santini", the father of the writer Pat Conroy.
