= John A. Harman =

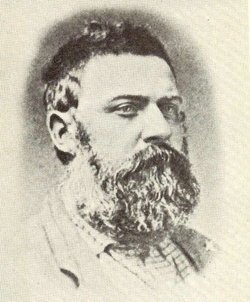
- Born: February 29, 1824; Waynesboro, Virginia, US
- Died: July 19, 1874 (aged 50); Staunton, Virginia, US
- Burial place: Thornrose Cemetery, Staunton, Virginia
- Spouse: Elizabeth Valentine Garber
- Relatives: Brother of William Henry Harman
- Military career
- Allegiance: United States of America; Confederate States of America
- Branch: United States Volunteers; Confederate States Army
- Service years: 1846; 1861–1865
- Rank: Private; Major
- Commands: Quartermaster, Second Corps, Army of Northern Virginia
- Conflicts: Mexican–American War: Battle of Monterrey; American Civil War: Battle of Yorktown; Battle of Fair Oaks; Seven Days' Battles; Battle of Antietam; Battle of Fredericksburg; Battle of Chancellorsville; Battle of Gettysburg; Battle of Bristoe Station; Mine Run Campaign; Battle of the Wilderness; Battle of Spotsylvania Courthouse; Battle of Cold Harbor; Second Battle of Ream's Station (WIA)

John Alexander Harman (February 29, 1824 – July 19, 1874) was a Confederate States Army officer during the American Civil War, serving as quartermaster to Stonewall Jackson in his different commands. After the general's death, he continued as quartermaster of the Second Corps, sometimes also as acting chief quartermaster of the Army of Northern Virginia.

== Early life ==
Harman was born in Waynesboro, Virginia, to the former Sarah Jane Garber and her husband Lewis Harman. His father died when he was 16 years old. His maternal grandfather, John Cunningham, had been a member of Staunton's Committee of Safety in the American Revolutionary War, as well as captain of a cavalry company in the Virginia militia. John received a private education suitable to his class. He had an elder brother Michael Garber Harman and younger brothers William Henry Harman, Asher Waterman Harman and Thomas Lewis Harman. His four brothers would likewise fight in the Confederate States Army, but mostly as quartermasters, and two died. William H. Harman, a prominent local lawyer, would begin the war as a Brigadier General of the Virginia militia and helped secure the Harper's Ferry arsenal immediately after secession. However, health problems caused him to be assigned as an aide-de-camp to Brig. Gen. Edward Johnson and to command reservists in the Shenandoah Valley; he would die in Battle of Waynesboro. Their youngest brother T.L. Harman would become a Lieutenant in the Staunton Artillery of the Confederate States Army, but die in September 1861 of typhoid fever in Prince William County, Virginia.

== Early career ==
Harman began his working life as a newspaper editor, first at the Staunton Spectator, later of the Lewisburg Observer. During the Mexican–American War, he abandoned the press, and fought as a member of Hays' Texas Rangers in Captain Gillespie's company. After the Texas war, Harman became a butcher in Staunton. His eldest brother Michael Garber Harman ran a stage line with the help of their brother Asher Waterman Harmon, as well as a hotel in Staunton with William H. Garber. John Harmon lived in the hotel before his marriage, as did other relatives. By 1860, Michael Harman owned 41 slaves, three of them leased out to others. Meanwhile, another brother, William Henry Harman (1828-1865), a Texas war veteran, became a prominent lawyer in Staunton and the commonwealth's attorney. John Harmon became a justice of the peace, as well as an officer in the Virginia militia.

Although Augusta County was a Whig stronghold, Harman was an active Democrat, noted for his efforts in the struggle against the Know Nothings. During the 1860 election, Harman supported Stephen A. Douglas and the Northern Democratic Party, but after the election of Lincoln, he began to argue for cooperation with the seceded states.

== Civil War ==
Major John A. Harman, Jackson's Quartermaster, big-bodied, big-voiced, untiring, fearless of man or devil, who would have ordered Jackson himself out of his way if necessary to obey Jackson's order.

Henry Kyd Douglas

Harman became Stonewall Jackson's quartermaster when the general took command at Harpers Ferry in the spring of 1861, and he was commissioned as Captain, Assistant Quartermaster, PACS. General Jackson personally recruited Harman for the post of quartermaster although he was by no means a willing recruit; at the beginning of the war he wanted to go back to his business, later he would have preferred to fight as a combat officer. Nevertheless, Stonewall persuaded Harman, and General Robert E. Lee appointed him. It was Harman who secured two sorrel horses for Jackson in May 1861 from a Union supply train. The smaller of the two horses, "Little Sorrel" became Jackson's famed mount until his death in May, 1863.

Soon promoted to Major, Harman was well known for his efficiency as well as his profanity. Despite Jackson's appreciation of Harman's talents as supply and transport officer, the relationship between the two men was not smooth. Harman proved a critical observer of Jackson's tactical performance. After the battle of McDowell 1862, Harman wrote to his brother that, "We have been worsted by miss-management. I am more than ever satisfied of Jackson's incompetency." During Jackson's Valley Campaign, Harman received 48 hours leave because his children were sick with scarlet fever. When he came home to Staunton, he found two children dead and two seriously ill. Harman requested extension of his leave, but it was denied. When later one of the children died, he requested leave to attend the funeral, but it was again denied. Another source of friction was Harman's habitual use of profanities.

After Jackson's death, Harman served as Quartermaster to General Richard S. Ewell. Sometimes he also served as Acting Chief Quartermaster to General Lee.

== Postbellum ==
After the war, Harman again became active in civic affairs, participating in the Valley Railroad Convention, and becoming a delegate to the Conservative Party convention. He soon, however, abandoned his previous political convictions, becoming a Republican, and working for the emancipation of the African-Americans of Virginia. In 1869, he chaired the Republican Party in Augusta County. Harman later turned down an appointment to serve on the Central Executive Committee of the Republican Party, but served in the Republican state convention of 1870. The administration rewarded his efforts with the postmastership of Staunton.

== Family ==
Harman married his cousin Elizabeth Garber in 1849. After they built Bellefonte 1 ½ mile outside Staunton, they would have 13 children, of which five predeceased their parents.
