= Frank R. Hancock =

United States Army officer (born 1950)

Frank R Hancock
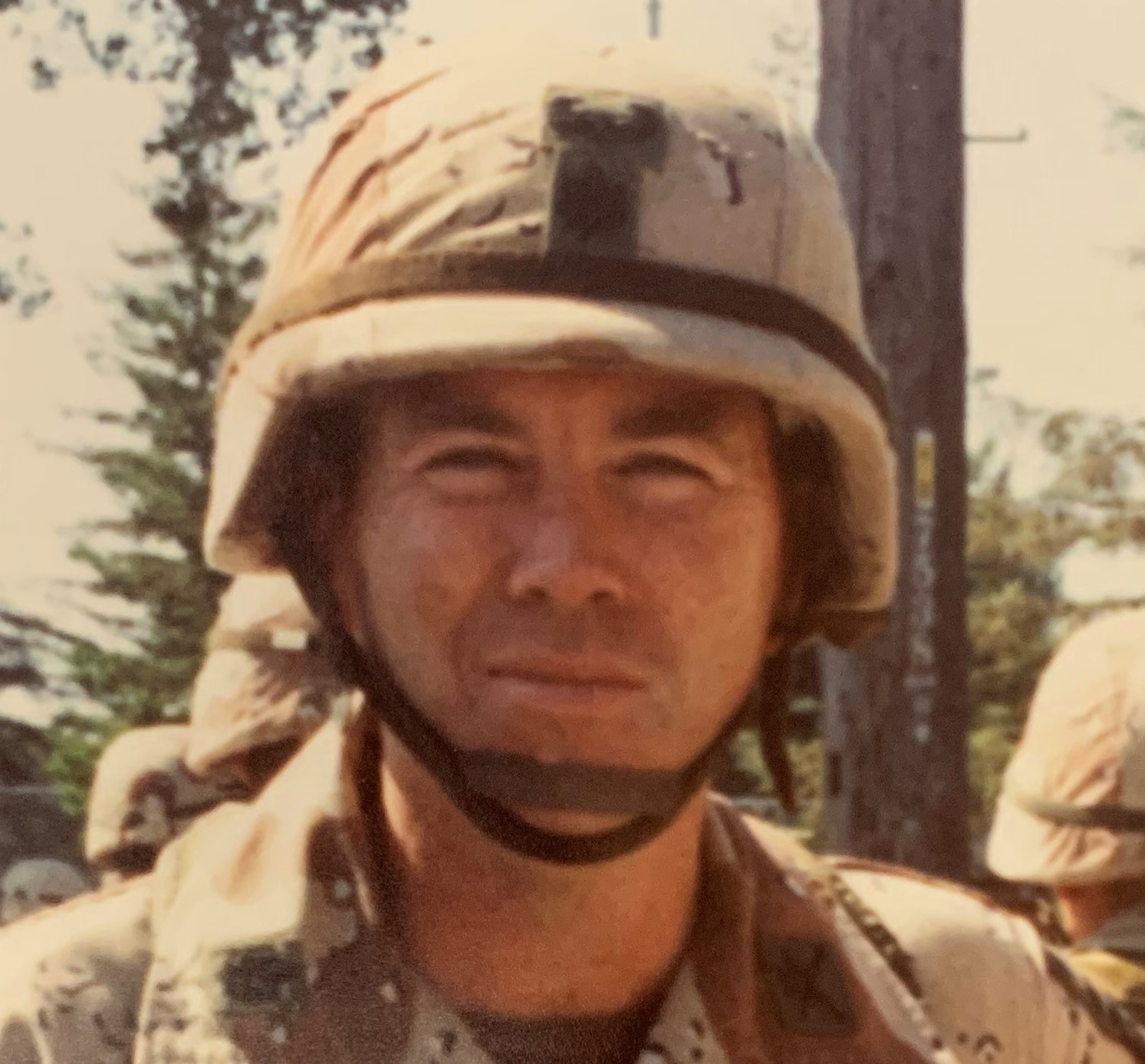
- Born: November 23, 1950 (age 75); Henderson, Kentucky, U.S.
- Allegiance: United States
- Branch: United States Army
- Service years: 1972–2003
- Rank: Colonel

Frank Rapier Hancock (born 23 November 1950) is a retired United States Army officer who served as battalion commander of the 1-327th Infantry Regiment during Desert Shield / Desert Storm, 101st Airborne Division. Colonel Hancock received notoriety when his Infantry Battalion, 1-327th Infantry, was the lead battalion of the 101st Airborne Division's invasion of Iraq in Desert Storm. The Division's attack would be the first part of Gen Norman Schwarzkopf Jr's "Hail Mary" flanking maneuver. during Desert Storm. On 24 February 1991, the 101st Airborne Division (AASLT) conducted the largest helicopter air assault in military history as it struck 93 miles inside Iraq with over 2,000 men. The Division's assault established a Forward Operating Base (FOB Cobra) which allowed the attack to sever Highway 8 in the Euphrates River Valley. Colonel Hancock's battalion was the lead battalion of the air assault and subsequently captured 344 prisoners in combat operations at FOB Cobra after attacking an Iraqi battalion-size strongpoint position which had not been identified in pre-combat intelligence analysis.

== Career ==
Hancock graduated from the United States Military Academy at West Point, New York in 1972. Upon graduation he was commissioned as a 2nd Lieutenant in the Infantry. He served as a rifle platoon leader, anti-tank platoon leader, and company executive officer with the 3rd Infantry Division in Germany; a Company Commander at Ft Drum, New York; a Company Commander, and a Battalion Operations Officer with the 101st Airborne Division (AASLT); a Battalion Executive Officer, Brigade Operations Officer, Secretary of the General Staff, and Deputy Division Operations Officer with the 25th Infantry Division (United States) United States in Hawaii; a Battalion Commander (1-327th Inf) with the 101st Airborne Division (AASLT); and the Strategy Officer and Command Briefer for US Pacific Command in Hawaii. Colonel Hancock would finish his thirty-year Army career as the Chairman of the Department of Military Strategy, Plans and Operations at the United States Army War College.

=== Desert Shield / Desert Storm ===
During the Gulf War, Hancock was the youngest battalion commander in the 101st Airborne Division. On 24 February 1991, LTC Hancock's battalion, 1st Battalion of 327th Infantry Regiment (United States), was the lead infantry element tasked with seizing the terrain necessary to establish Forward Operating Base (FOB) Cobra in Iraq. FOB Cobra was more than 100 kilometers inside Iraq and approximately 400 square kilometers in size. It was the division's first objective inside Iraq and was considered critical to follow-on operations by both the division and corps commanders. This air assault was to become the largest operation of its kind in history.

=== Army War College ===
A 1995 Army War College graduate, Hancock completed his 30 years of service as chair of the Department of Military Plans, Strategy and Operations, 1998–2002. He is also a former holder of the "Matthew Ridgeway Leadership Chair" at the US Army War College and a member of Veterans of Foreign Wars.

== Later life ==
Upon retirement from the Army, Colonel (Ret) Hancock was the Senior Army Instructor for JROTC at Cedar Cliff High School from 2002 to 2018. In 2017, he was awarded the Pennsylvania State Civics Teacher of the Year. Hancock retired to Camp Hill, Pennsylvania near the Army War College is the war college community's dance instructor. He provides classes in several different dance instruction to students and their spouses.

== Works ==
North to the Euphrates: Part 1. The Taking of FOB Cobra by LTC Frank Hancock, US War College Study Paper

== Books ==
Hancock, Frank (2025). Operation Desert Storm: How Two Young Intelligence Analysts and an Infantry Battalion Changed the War in Iraq. London: Pen & Sword. ISBN 978-1036130435.
