= William Henry Harman =

American politician

- Born: February 17, 1828; Waynesboro, Virginia, US
- Died: March 2, 1865 (aged 37); Waynesboro, Virginia, US
- Burial place: Staunton, Virginia
- Relatives: Brother John A. Harman
- Military career
- Allegiance: Confederate States of America
- Branch: Virginia militia Confederate States Army
- Service years: 1861–1865
- Rank: Brigadier General (militia); Colonel (CSA)
- Conflicts: American Civil War: First Battle of Bull Run; First Battle of Kernstown; Jackson's Valley Campaign; Battle of Piedmont; Battle of Waynesboro, Virginia

William Henry Harman (February 17, 1828 – March 2, 1865) was a brigadier general in the Virginia militia and colonel in the Confederate States Army during the American Civil War, who was killed in action during the Battle of Waynesboro, Virginia (the town where he was born), on March 2, 1865.

A lawyer, Harman had served as a second lieutenant in the 1st Virginia Infantry Regiment during the Mexican–American War, and became the commonwealth's attorney for Augusta County, Virginia (from 1851 until Virginia's secession). A brigadier general in the Virginia militia, Harman became one of the commanders whose forces seized the Harper's Ferry Armory and Arsenal on April 18, 1861, the day after the Virginia Secession Convention of 1861 voted for secession. Later lieutenant colonel of the 5th Virginia Infantry Regiment of the Stonewall Brigade (from May 7, 1861 to April 1862), Harman suffered health problems and was not appointed colonel in the April 1862 reorganization of the Confederate Army. Harman served briefly as an aide-de-camp to Brigadier General Edward Johnson during Jackson's Valley Campaign, after which he was appointed an assistant adjutant general on February 19, 1864. He also led a noble regiment of reservists at the Battle of Piedmont on June 5, 1864.

== Early and family life ==
William Henry Harman was born in Waynesboro, Virginia on February 17, 1828. His parents were Lewis and Sally (Garber) Harman. His maternal grandfather, John Cunningham, has been a member of Staunton's Committee of Safety during the American Revolutionary War, as well as captain of a cavalry company in the Virginia militia. William received a private education suitable to his class. He had elder brothers Michael Garber Harman (1823–1877) and John A. Harman (1824–1874), as well as younger brothers Asher Waterman Harman (1830–1895) and Thomas Lewis Harman (1831–1861). Michael Garber Harman ran a stage line with the help of their brother Asher Waterman Harmon, as well as a hotel in Staunton with William H. Garber. By 1860, Michael Harman owned 41 slaves, three of them leased out to others. His brothers would likewise fight in the Confederate States Army, and the youngest, T.L. Harman, a Lieutenant in the Staunton Artillery, died in September 1861 of typhoid fever in Prince William County, Virginia.

William H. Harman served as a second lieutenant in the 1st Virginia Infantry Regiment during the Mexican–American War. After the war, he studied law and became a lawyer at Staunton, Virginia. He was commonwealth's attorney for Augusta County, Virginia from 1851 until the beginning of the Civil War.

This Harman married the former Margaret Singleton Garver. They had eight children: Kenton, Fannie, Arthur C., Albert Garver, Ellen, Augusta, Louis and Edward Valentine.

== Confederate States Army officer ==
Governor John Letcher appointed William Henry Harman brigadier general of the 13th Brigade of Virginia militia on April 10, 1861. After the battle of Fort Sumter April 12–13, 1861, ex-governor Henry A. Wise approached Captain John D. Imboden of the Staunton Artillery, Virginia militia, then in Richmond, and proposed a preemptive strike directed at the United States Armory and Arsenal at Harpers Ferry. Wise and Imboden met with a number of militia officers at the Exchange Hotel, among them Turner Ashby and Harman. When Governor Letcher refused to give his official approval of the action, the men decided to act on their own. Harman was sent to Staunton to raise volunteers to follow Imboden's battery to Harpers Ferry. When the Virginia convention passed the secession ordinance, Governor Letcher gave his blessing to the action, and Harpers Ferry was taken on April 18.

Harman's troops were under the overall command of Virginia militia Major General Kenton Harper. VMI professor Stonewall Jackson arrived on April 28, 1861 to organized and train the raw Virginia forces.

On May 7, 1861, the 5th Virginia Infantry Regiment, with Kenton Harper as colonel and William Henry Harman as lieutenant colonel was formed at Harper's Ferry. The regiment was assigned to Stonewall Jackson's brigade; his elder brother, Col. Michael Garber Harman, was quartermaster, succeeded by their brother Major John A. Harman. The regiment fought at the First Battle of Bull Run where Jackson received his famous nickname on July 21, 1861. Harman succeeded Harper as colonel of the regiment on September 11, 1861 when Harper resigned. Harman led the regiment at the First Battle of Kernstown on March 23, 1862. However, his men did not re-elect him as colonel when the Confederate Army reorganized in April 1862.

Thereafter, Harman briefly served as aide-de-camp to Brigadier General Edward "Allegheny" Johnson in Jackson's Valley Campaign during April 1862. Harman was appointed an assistant adjutant general on February 19, 1864. He commanded a regiment of reservists at the Battle of Piedmont, a Confederate defeat in the Shenandoah Valley on June 5, 1864 during the Valley Campaigns of 1864.

== Death and legacy ==
William Henry Harman was killed in action while attempting to rally his troops during the Confederate rout at the Battle of Waynesboro, Virginia, the town where he was born, on March 2, 1865. He is buried in Thornrose Cemetery, Staunton, Virginia. At the time of his death, Harman was serving his second term as Grand Master Mason of Virginia. His brothers would rebuild and expand the railroads connecting at Staunton and son Arthur C. Harman would follow his father's political career and serve in both houses of the Virginia General Assembly.

== See also ==
- List of American Civil War generals (Acting Confederate)
