= Waynesboro, Virginia =

Independent city in Virginia, United States

- Independent city
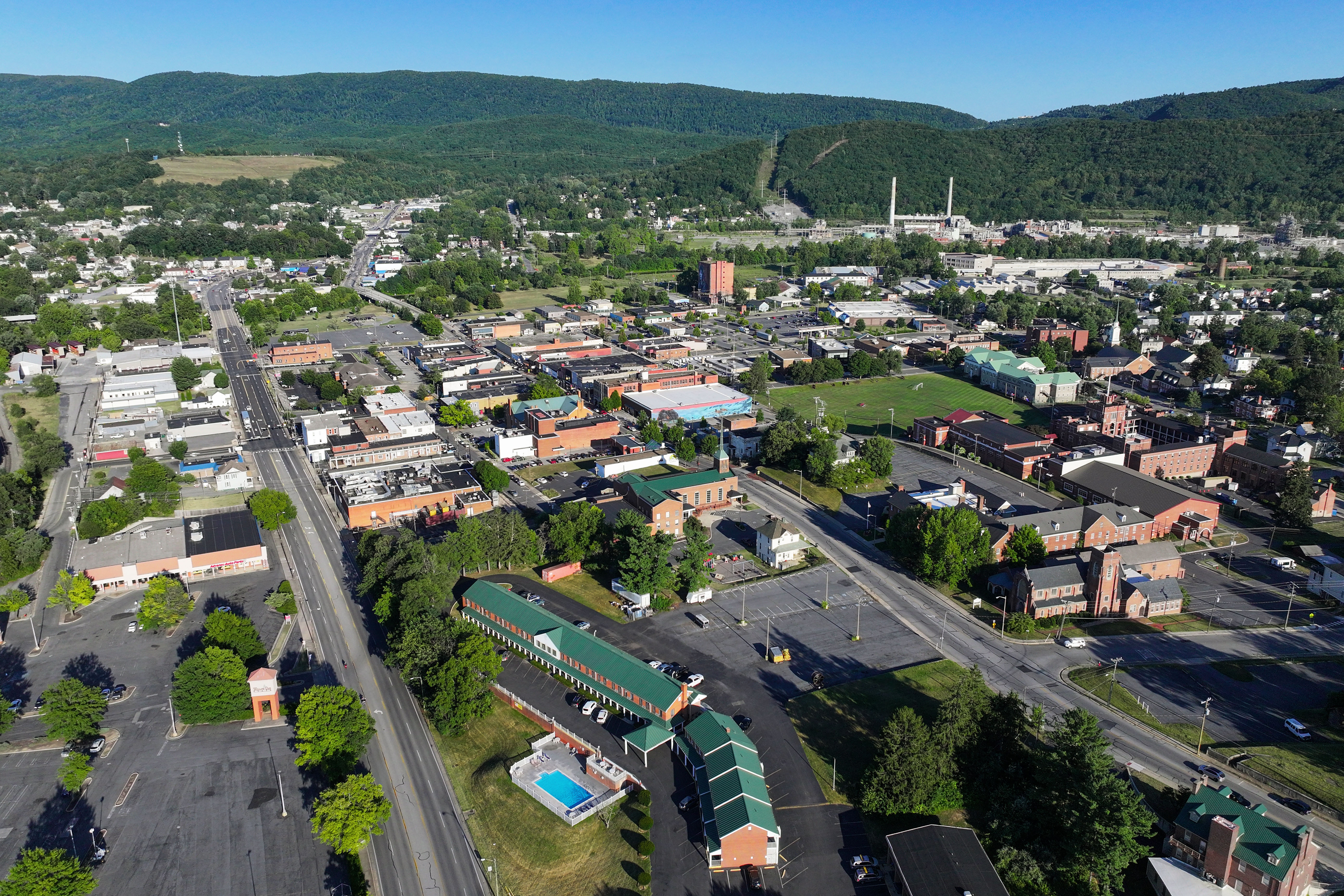
- Downtown Waynesboro

- Location of Waynesboro, Virginia
- Coordinates: 38°4′12″N 78°53′40″W
- Country: United States
- State: Virginia

Government
  - Mayor: Kenny Lee

Area
  - Total: 15.11 sq mi (39.14 km^{2})
  - Land: 14.97 sq mi (38.77 km^{2})
  - Water: 0.14 sq mi (0.36 km^{2})
- Elevation: 1,286 ft (392 m)

Population (2020)
  - Total: 22,196
  - Estimate (2025): 23,951 ▲
  - Density: 1,483/sq mi (572.5/km^{2})
- Time zone: UTC−5 (Eastern (EST))
  - Summer (DST): UTC−4 (EDT)
- ZIP code: 22980
- Area code(s): 540, 826
- FIPS code: 51-83680
- GNIS feature ID: 1500288
- Website: waynesboro.va.us

Waynesboro (/ˈweɪnzbʌroʊ/; formerly Flack) is an independent city in the Commonwealth of Virginia, United States. It is one of two cities in the Staunton-Stuarts Draft Metropolitan Statistical Area, with Staunton being the largest. Waynesboro is located in the Shenandoah Valley and is surrounded by Augusta County. As of the 2020 United States census, the population was 22,196.

== History ==
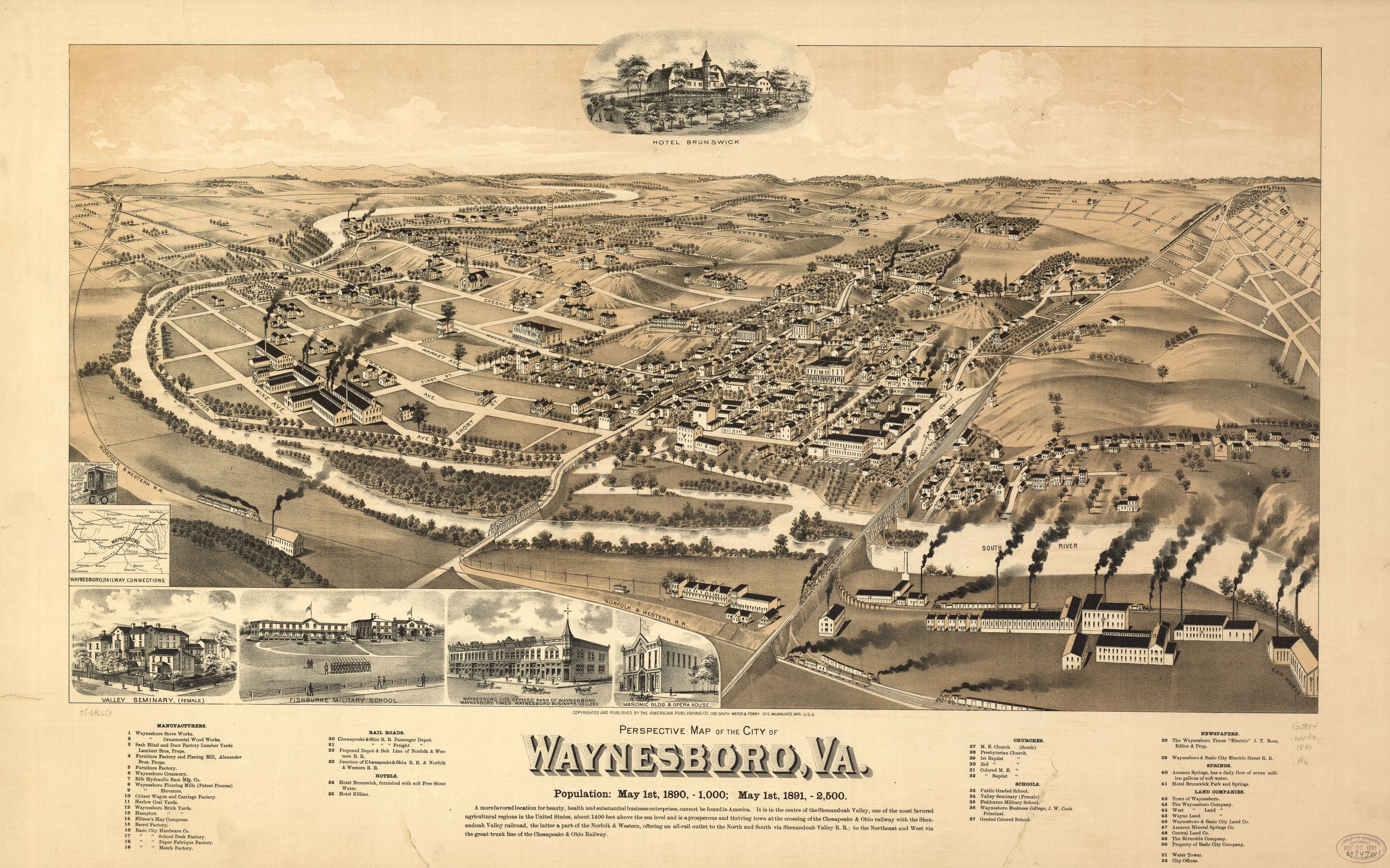
1891 map of Waynesboro looking westward with the "Iron Cross" rail junction and Basic City area factories at the bottom and downtown toward the center.

Still in the area of the Colony of Virginia after the American Revolution, independence and statehood for the Commonwealth of Virginia, the areas west of the Appalachian and Blue Ridge Mountains were known as the frontier. Travel by wagon over the mountains was considered nearly impossible except where nature afforded some gap between them. Until after the Civil War, Jarmans Gap, some six miles northeast of Waynesboro, was a major crossing of the Blue Ridge Mountains, making Waynesboro a convenient stop for many who sought to travel west.

In the mid-18th century, Waynesboro was commonly referred to as Teasville (or Teesville). Shortly after U.S. Army General Anthony Wayne's victory at the Battle of Fallen Timbers in 1794 during the Northwest Indian War, the area began to be called Waynesborough. Many settlers to the area originated from Pennsylvania. General Wayne's popularity with Pennsylvanians is suspected to have helped contribute to its name.

As early as 1798, the downtown area was platted and sold. On January 8, 1801, the town of Waynesborough was officially recognized by the state of Virginia and was incorporated by 1834.

Some of the remaining buildings from this period of its history include the Plumb House (a museum open for tours seasonally) and the Coiner-Quesenbury House, built in 1806, believed to be the first brick house built in the town, which is still standing on Main Street.

Population growth in the town was slow at first. In 1810, the town had a population of 250, and by 1860 it had grown to 457. The town experienced a steady stream of visitors primarily due to its position on Three Notch'd Road, which connected Staunton to the west with Charlottesville and Richmond to the east. This path crossed the Blue Ridge Mountains through Jarman's Gap. A railroad tunnel was constructed through Rockfish Gap a short time before the Civil War. This established Rockfish Gap as the major crossing through the mountains between Waynesboro and Charlottesville.

On March 2, 1865, Waynesboro was the site of the last battle of the Civil War for the Confederate Lt. General Jubal A. Early. The Battle of Waynesboro lasted twenty minutes, was a complete victory for George Armstrong Custer, and was a final blow to the Confederate Army in the Shenandoah Valley. Sometime afterwards, General Early relinquished the town and the valley to General Philip Sheridan. Many of the buildings from this period still show damage from the battle. During and after the war, casualties from the nearby Valley Campaign and other battles were buried in Ridgeview Cemetery where the Waynesboro Confederate Monument lists and commemorates their names and states.

After the war, the Waynesboro area became the junction of two important railroad lines: an east-to-west track (operated by the Chesapeake and Ohio Railway) and a north–south trunk line (of the Shenandoah Valley Railroad, which soon became the Norfolk and Western Railway). The tracks intersected near Waynesboro, giving the site the nickname of the "Iron Cross." The transportation advantages coming from the Iron Cross fueled hopes for economic development.

In a flurry of land speculation, land lots to the east of Waynesboro, mostly on the east side of South River, were platted and sold in 1890. That year the area was incorporated as the Town of Basic City. An opera house, a wide boulevard named Commerce Avenue, and the upscale Hotel Brunswick were built there. A friendly rivalry soon developed between the two towns with each attempting to outdo the other's development. The overall population from May 1, 1890, to May 1 of 1891 rose 150%, from 1,000 people to 2,500. Unlike Basic City, Waynesboro had implemented laws banning the sale of alcohol. Effects of the Panic of 1896 abruptly dried up the boomtown investment in Basic City; grand plans for more hotels and manufacturing complexes were scuttled. The established blocks of small-size land plots meant for worker housing remain, and the former Basic City area became largely low-income housing.

Waynesboro steadily prospered and circa 1900–1920 many spacious houses were built on a scenic hill that was gridded into the "Tree Streets" neighborhood, with residential lanes named Oak Avenue, Chestnut Avenue, Poplar Avenue, and the like. In 1923, Waynesboro and Basic City consolidated into a single town to be called Waynesboro-Basic. Later, officials dropped Basic and the name became Waynesboro, with the former Basic City disappearing as one of the "lost towns of Virginia." Since 1924, Waynesboro has made numerous territorial acquisitions from areas of Augusta County through annexation and officially became an independent city in 1948. In 2005, Waynesboro established a new charter, repealing one in place since 1948.

== Geography ==
Waynesboro is located at 38°4′11″N 78°53′40″W (38.069874, -78.894517). It averages 1,305 feet above sea level, ranging from 1,050 feet to 1,800 feet above sea level. According to the United States Census Bureau, the city has a total area of 15.2 square miles (39.4 km^{2}), of which 15.0 square miles (38.8 km^{2}) is land and 0.2 square miles (0.52 km^{2}) (1.0%) is water.

Waynesboro is located in the Shenandoah Valley. It is in the Valley and Ridge physiographic province. The South River, a tributary of the Shenandoah River, flows through the city.

=== Climate ===
Climate data for WAYNESBORO WTP, VA, 1991-2020 normals
Month	Jan	Feb	Mar	Apr	May	Jun	Jul	Aug	Sep	Oct	Nov	Dec	Year
Mean daily maximum °F (°C)	44.2 (6.8)	47.6 (8.7)	55.4 (13.0)	66.3 (19.1)	74.2 (23.4)	82.1 (27.8)	85.7 (29.8)	84.6 (29.2)	77.5 (25.3)	67.7 (19.8)	56.4 (13.6)	47.1 (8.4)	65.7 (18.7)
Daily mean °F (°C)	33.8 (1.0)	36.2 (2.3)	43.4 (6.3)	53.0 (11.7)	62.1 (16.7)	70.4 (21.3)	74.5 (23.6)	73.0 (22.8)	66.0 (18.9)	55.1 (12.8)	44.5 (6.9)	37.0 (2.8)	54.1 (12.3)
Mean daily minimum °F (°C)	23.4 (−4.8)	24.9 (−3.9)	31.3 (−0.4)	39.8 (4.3)	50.0 (10.0)	58.6 (14.8)	63.3 (17.4)	61.4 (16.3)	54.5 (12.5)	42.6 (5.9)	32.7 (0.4)	26.8 (−2.9)	42.4 (5.8)
Average precipitation inches (mm)	3.16 (80)	2.80 (71)	4.11 (104)	3.94 (100)	3.59 (91)	4.47 (114)	3.68 (93)	3.69 (94)	5.46 (139)	3.41 (87)	4.03 (102)	2.99 (76)	45.33 (1,151)
Average precipitation days (≥ 0.01 in)	8.3	7.4	8.5	10.3	11.8	10.6	10.9	10.8	8.5	8.6	7.4	8.6	111.7
Source: NOAA

== Demographics ==
Historical population
Census	Pop.	Note	%±
1860	457		—
1870	536		17.3%
1880	484		−9.7%
1890	646		33.5%
1900	856		32.5%
1910	1,389		62.3%
1920	1,594		14.8%
1930	6,226		290.6%
1940	7,373		18.4%
1950	12,357		67.6%
1960	15,694		27.0%
1970	16,707		6.5%
1980	15,329		−8.2%
1990	18,549		21.0%
2000	19,520		5.2%
2010	21,006		7.6%
2020	22,196		5.7%
2025 (est.)	23,951	▲	7.9%
U.S. Decennial Census; 1790-1960 1900-1990; 1990-2000 2010 2020

=== Racial and ethnic composition ===
Waynesboro city, Virginia – Racial and ethnic composition Note: the US Census treats Hispanic/Latino as an ethnic category. This table excludes Latinos from the racial categories and assigns them to a separate category. Hispanics/Latinos may be of any race.
Race / Ethnicity (NH = Non-Hispanic)	Pop 1980	Pop 1990	Pop 2000	Pop 2010	Pop 2020	% 1980	% 1990	% 2000	% 2010	% 2020
White alone (NH)	13,896	16,586	16,492	16,704	16,074	90.65%	89.42%	84.49%	79.52%	72.42%
Black or African American alone (NH)	1,274	1,738	1,935	2,176	2,610	8.31%	9.37%	9.91%	10.36%	11.76%
Native American or Alaska Native alone (NH)	12	30	50	50	33	0.08%	0.16%	0.26%	0.24%	0.15%
Asian alone (NH)	37	44	112	154	258	0.24%	0.24%	0.57%	0.73%	1.16%
Native Hawaiian or Pacific Islander alone (NH)	x	x	6	5	20	x	x	0.03%	0.02%	0.09%
Other race alone (NH)	19	1	18	29	104	0.12%	0.01%	0.09%	0.14%	0.47%
Mixed race or Multiracial (NH)	x	x	264	551	1,152	x	x	1.35%	2.62%	5.19%
Hispanic or Latino (any race)	91	150	643	1,337	1,945	0.59%	0.81%	3.29%	6.36%	8.76%
Total	15,329	18,549	19,520	21,006	22,196	100.00%	100.00%	100.00%	100.00%	100.00%

=== 2020 census ===
As of the 2020 census, Waynesboro had a population of 22,196. The median age was 40.7 years. 21.5% of residents were under the age of 18 and 19.9% of residents were 65 years of age or older. For every 100 females there were 91.2 males, and for every 100 females age 18 and over there were 87.2 males.

97.6% of residents lived in urban areas, while 2.4% lived in rural areas.

There were 9,557 households in Waynesboro, of which 28.1% had children under the age of 18 living in them. Of all households, 38.6% were married-couple households, 19.6% were households with a male householder and no spouse or partner present, and 33.1% were households with a female householder and no spouse or partner present. About 32.8% of all households were made up of individuals and 13.4% had someone living alone who was 65 years of age or older.

There were 10,268 housing units, of which 6.9% were vacant. The homeowner vacancy rate was 2.0% and the rental vacancy rate was 6.8%.

=== 2010 census ===
As of the census of 2010, there were 21,006 people, 8,903 households, and 5,589 families residing in the city. The population density was 1,364 people per square mile (527 people/km^{2}). There were 9,717 housing units at an average density of 631 units per square mile (244 units/km^{2}). The racial makeup of the city was 82.2% White, 10.6% African American, 0.3% Native American, 0.7% Asian, 0.02% Pacific Islander, 2.9% from other races, and 3.2% from two or more races. Hispanic or Latino of any race were 6.4% of the population.

There were 8,903 households, of which 27.1% had children under the age of 18 living with them, 42.4% were married couples living together, 15.3% had a female householder with no husband present, and 37.2% were non-families. 30.8% of all households were made up of individuals, and 11.9% had someone living alone who was 65 years of age or older. The average household size was 2.34 and the average family size was 2.90.

In the city, the population was spread out, with 23.3% under the age of 18, 8.2% from 18 to 24, 25.8% from 25 to 44, 25.7% from 45 to 64, and 17.0% who were 65 years of age or older. The median age was 38.8 years. For every 100 females, there were 91.5 males. For every 100 females aged eighteen and over, there were 85.7 males.

The median income for a household in the city was $41,077, and the median income for a family was $55,668. Males had a median income of $36,013 versus $30,699 for females. The per capita income for the city was $24,372. About 12.9% of families and 18.0% of the population were below the poverty line, including 27.6% of those under age 18 and 11.0% of those age 65 or over.

== Economy ==
A large former DuPont plant and the associated Benger Laboratory where spandex was invented (under the brand name Lycra), as well as a large textile mill called Wayn-Tex (now owned by Mohawk Industries), were significant employers for residents through much of the 20th century. The DuPont plant was later sold to Koch Industries as part of the subsidiary company Invista. In January 2019, the plant was again sold to Chinese luxury apparel firm Shandong Ruyi Group and rebranded as The Lycra Company. A General Electric site on the northeast side, which made relays and later computer printers, was also a substantial employer. Waynesboro was home to the corporate headquarters of nTelos (a regional wireless and telecommunications company serving Virginia, West Virginia, North Carolina, Tennessee, Kentucky, and Ohio) before that company's merger with Shentel. Tourism, industrial production, and retail remain vital to the Waynesboro economy.

== Arts and culture ==
=== Film and television ===
Two movies have filmed scenes in Waynesboro: Toy Soldiers (1991) and Evan Almighty (2007). The city has been mentioned several times on television series The Waltons.

=== Architecture ===
Nearby is Swannanoa palace, which was listed on the National Register of Historic Places in 1969.

== Sports ==
The Generals of the Valley Baseball League play there.

== Parks and recreation ==
The Blue Ridge Parkway, Skyline Drive, and the Appalachian Trail are fewer than 5 miles (8.0 km) from Waynesboro. Near Waynesboro, is the west portal and visitor parking for the historical Blue Ridge Tunnel, which opened to the public as a linear park in 2021.

== Government ==
United States presidential election results for Waynesboro, Virginia
Year	Republican		Democratic		Third party(ies)	
Year	No.	%	No.	%	No.	%
1948	833	46.43%	839	46.77%	122	6.80%
1952	1,680	69.62%	730	30.25%	3	0.12%
1956	2,049	71.00%	748	25.92%	89	3.08%
1960	2,444	69.57%	1,047	29.80%	22	0.63%
1964	2,107	46.50%	2,369	52.28%	55	1.21%
1968	3,301	61.38%	1,446	26.89%	631	11.73%
1972	4,163	77.75%	1,061	19.82%	130	2.43%
1976	3,528	59.64%	2,209	37.35%	178	3.01%
1980	3,697	61.84%	1,926	32.22%	355	5.94%
1984	4,465	73.45%	1,579	25.97%	35	0.58%
1988	4,672	68.72%	2,038	29.97%	89	1.31%
1992	3,758	52.57%	2,302	32.20%	1,089	15.23%
1996	3,466	52.71%	2,398	36.47%	712	10.83%
2000	4,084	57.50%	2,737	38.54%	281	3.96%
2004	5,092	63.95%	2,792	35.06%	79	0.99%
2008	4,815	54.35%	3,906	44.09%	139	1.57%
2012	4,790	54.49%	3,840	43.68%	161	1.83%
2016	4,801	52.16%	3,764	40.90%	639	6.94%
2020	5,507	51.39%	4,961	46.29%	249	2.32%
2024	5,882	51.97%	5,240	46.29%	197	1.74%

Like the rest of the Shenandoah Valley, Waynesboro is a traditionally Republican stronghold. Despite improved Democratic performance over time, Waynesboro has remained Republican even since the 2008 presidential election, which marked the beginning of a string of Democratic presidential victories in other Valley independent cities such as Harrisonburg, Staunton, and Winchester. Joe Biden, in 2020, received the highest percentage (46.3%) of Waynesboro votes for any Democratic presidential candidate in 56 years, but still received 546 fewer votes than then-president Donald Trump.

== Education ==
The Waynesboro City Public Schools system serves the area and operates Waynesboro High School. Waynesboro is the home of Fishburne Military School, an all-male private military boarding school for grades 8 through 12.

== Infrastructure ==
=== Transportation ===
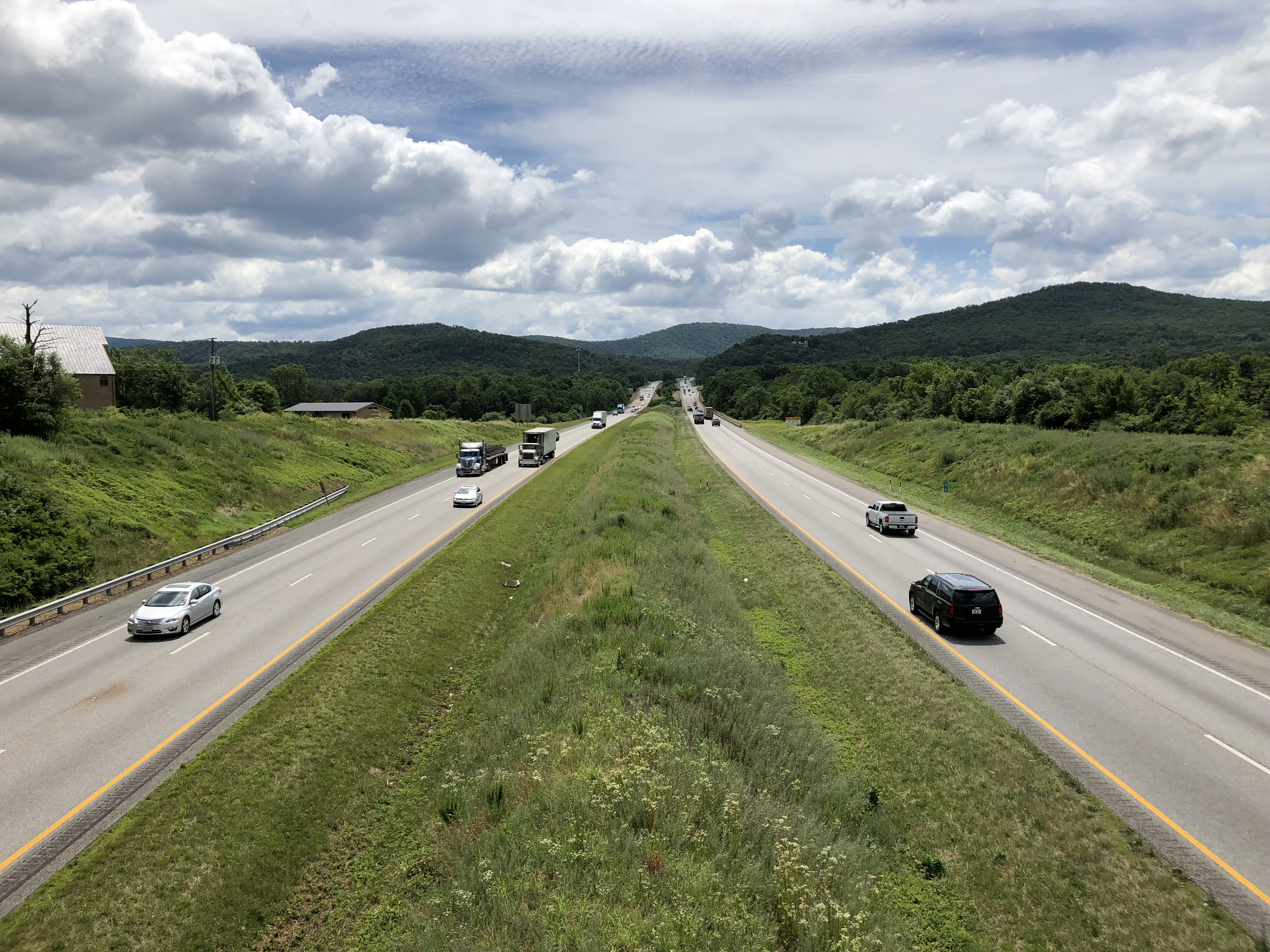
I-64 in Waynesboro

==== Intercity rail ====
The city is served by two freight rail lines, owned by Norfolk Southern and CSX. The intersection of the two lines is known as "The Iron Cross", a historically significant symbol of the city's economic growth.

==== Freeways and primary routes ====
The main highway through Waynesboro is Interstate 64, which runs east to west across much of Virginia. It also has a junction with Interstate 81 just to the west of Waynesboro, the main north–south highway across western Virginia. Additional highways serving Waynesboro include U.S. Route 250, U.S. Route 340, and Virginia State Route 254.

== Media ==
Waynesboro's local newspaper is The News Virginian.

== Notable people ==
- Cory Alexander, NBA basketball player and ACC Network announcer
- Ann Bedsole, politician, businesswoman, community activist, and philanthropist
- Shonn Bell, a professional football player
- Kenny Brooks, head coach of the University of Kentucky women's basketball team
- Carrie Buck, plaintiff in the United States Supreme Court case Buck v. Bell that dealt with forced sterilization
- Joseph Burns, U.S. Representative
- Ronnie R. Campbell, politician, Virginia House of Delegates
- Jeff Ray Clark, American economist
- Mark Cline, American artist and entertainer
- Lew DeWitt, singer and songwriter, member of The Statler Brothers
- Earl Hamner Jr., television writer and producer
- John A. Harman, Confederate States Army officer, chief quartermaster of the Army of Northern Virginia.
- William Henry Harman, Confederate general
- Reggie Harris, MLB baseball player
- Mary Louise Hawkins, air evacuation flight nurse who earned the Distinguished Flying Cross during World War II
- Lejaren Hiller, composer
- Nikki Hornsby, singer and songwriter
- Mikkel Borlaug Johnson, physicist
- Kid Kash, professional wrestler
- Elizabeth Massie, American horror author
- Richards Miller, one of the founders of the Venturing (Boy Scouts of America) program
- P. Buckley Moss, artist
- William Henry Sheppard, Presbyterian missionary to Africa
- Anne Tompkins, United States Attorney
- John Wetzel, former professional basketball player and coach
