= Joseph H. Harper =

United States Army general

- Born: May 1, 1901
- Died: August 8, 1990 (aged 89)
- Military career
- Allegiance: United States
- Branch: United States Army
- Service years: 1923–1959
- Rank: Major General
- Nickname: "Bud"
- Commands: United States Army Infantry School; 1st Brigade, 101st Airborne Division; 327th Glider Infantry Regiment; 401st Glider Infantry Regiment
- Conflicts: World War II: Operation Overlord; Battle of the Bulge
- Awards: Army Distinguished Service Medal; Silver Star; Legion of Merit; Bronze Star Medal

Joseph H. "Bud" Harper (May 1, 1901 – August 8, 1990) was a United States Army officer. Harper was the officer who delivered General Anthony McAuliffe's one-word response, "Nuts", to the German request for the surrender of Bastogne.

Colonel Harper had been appointed to command the 401st Glider Infantry Regiment. When the 401st was split to expand the 325th Glider Infantry Regiment and 327th Glider Infantry Regiment from two battalions to three, Harper took command of the 327th.

== "Nuts!" ==
On 22 December 1944, during the siege of Bastogne in the Battle of the Bulge, two German officers and two enlisted men came in the lines of the 327th carrying a white flag. They bore a note from the German commander requesting that the Americans surrender. Harper was contacted and personally took the Germans' request to the division command post. Brigadier General McAuliffe, who was in temporary command of the division, sent Harper back with the now-famous one word response, "Nuts."

Harper returned to the German officers with a medic, Ernie Premetz, as his translator.

I have the commander's reply, Harper said. He handed it to one of the German officers, who unfolded and read it. He looked up, puzzled.
"What does that mean?" he asked. "Is this affirmative or negative?"
"Definitely not affirmative," Harper said.

The Germans were confused by the use of American slang. Ernie Premetz recalled that he and Harper discussed how else to convey the message: "You can tell them to take a flying shit," Harper said to Premetz.

Premetz, knowing he had to convey the intent of the message, translated this as "Du kannst zum Teufel gehen." ("You can go to the Devil.")

== Post-war career ==
Harper remained in the army, reaching the rank of major general and serving as commandant of the United States Army Infantry School.
