= February 2021 North American winter storm =

February 2021 North American winter storm may refer to:

- January 31 – February 3, 2021 nor'easter, in eastern Canada and the northeastern United States
- February 6–8, 2021 nor'easter, in the southern and northeastern United States, and the North Atlantic
- February 10–12 and 11–14 ice storms, in the United States
- February 13–17, 2021 North American winter storm, in parts of Canada, northern Mexico, and the United States
- February 15–20, 2021 North American winter storm, in southern Canada, northern Mexico, and the United States
