= Kenton Harper =

American politician and soldier (1801-1867)

Member of the Virginia House of Delegates from Augusta County
- In office December 5, 1836 – December 1837 Serving with Alexander H.H. Stuart
- Preceded by: John J. Craig
- Succeeded by: William Kinney

Personal details
- Born: 1801 Chambersburg, Pennsylvania
- Died: December 25, 1867 (aged 65–66) Staunton, Virginia
- Resting place: Thornrose Cemetery in Staunton

Military service
- Allegiance: United States of America; Confederate States of America
- Branch/service: United States Army; Confederate States Army
- Years of service: 1846–1848 (USA); 1861, 1864–1865 (CSA)
- Rank: Captain (USA); Major General (Virginia militia); Brigadier General (Va. Provisional Army); Colonel (CSA)
- Battles/wars: Mexican–American War; American Civil War

Kenton Harper (1801 – December 25, 1867) was an American newspaper editor, soldier, Indian agent, plantation owner, banker and politician. Harper was an officer of the Virginia militia then U.S. Army during the Mexican–American War, and later became a Confederate general officer during the American Civil War, and reportedly helped nickname Stonewall Jackson.

== Early and family life ==
Harper was born in 1801 in the city of Chambersburg in Franklin County, Pennsylvania. He was a son of George Kenton Harper, publisher of the Franklin County Repository newspaper, and his wife Nancy McClintock.

By the U.S. Census of 1860, Harper married Ellen Calhoun. They had four children together; two son's named Samuel and George Kenton, and two daughters named Nancy and Mary. Ellen's sister Catherine Calhoun also lived with the family at this time. Harper's son Samuel C. Harper (1831–1901) would also serve in the Confederate Army, enlisting on August 6, 1862, in Staunton and becoming a quartermaster sergeant in the 62nd Virginia Infantry. Like his father, Samuel survived the war, and but unlike him be buried in the Augusta Stone Presbyterian Church Cemetery.

== Publishing and politics ==
During his youth Harper worked as a printer in Chambersburg. In 1823 he moved southward along to Appalachian foothills to Staunton, Virginia in the Shenandoah Valley. He bought a local newspaper called the Republican Farmer. In time it would become known as the Staunton Spectator, which he would publish until 1849. In 1836, voters in Staunton and surrounding Augusta County, Virginia elected Harper as one of their two representatives (beside veteran Alexander H.H.Stuart) in the Virginia House of Delegates, but he failed to win re-election. Later, voters elected him as Staunton's mayor.

During the Mexican War, Harper became a captain in the 1st Virginia Infantry, commanding the volunteer company from Augusta County that served in the northern frontier of Mexico. However he never saw combat and returned home to muster out in August 1848. Harper then was appointed acting inspector general of his brigade, and later was the military governor of Parras in the Mexican state of Coahuila. In 1860 Harper was appointed a major general in Virginia's state militia.

From 1851 to 1852, Harper was the United States agent to the Chickasaws at Fort Washita in the Indian Territory, then became an assistant U.S. Secretary of the Interior in Washington, D.C. He also was president of a Staunton-area bank.

== American Civil War ==
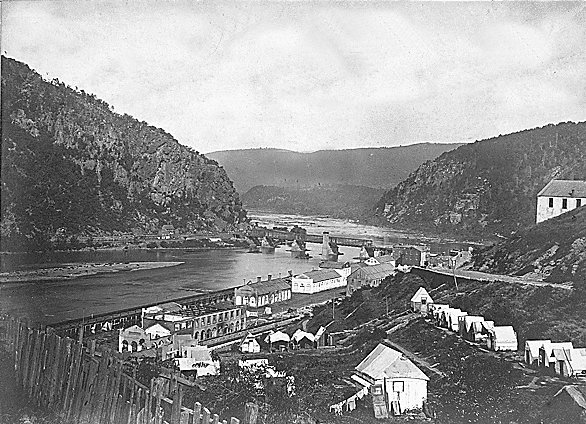
Harpers Ferry during the Civil War. Kenton Harper commanded the occupation forces there and the town itself in April 1861.

When the Civil War began in 1861 Harper chose to follow the Confederate cause. Still a major general in Virginia's state militia, he was given command of the 5th Virginia Infantry Regiment on April 10. Eight days later a force of 2,400 men led by Harper and Brig. Gen. William H. Harman seized the U.S. Army arsenal located at Harpers Ferry in modern-day West Virginia. Despite the fires set by the Union Army forces as they withdrew, Harper's militia managed to salvage 4,000 of the approximately 15,000 muskets in storage there, as well as 300 of the arsenal's milling machines and metal working lathes, plus about 57,000 tools and wooden stocks (all items used in rifle production), which were sent to the Tredegar Iron Works in Richmond, Virginia. On April 28 Confederate Col. Thomas J. "Stonewall" Jackson arrived to assume command of the forces at Harpers Ferry and began to organize the militia into regiments.

On May 1, 1861, Harper was appointed a brigadier general in the Virginia Provisional Army, an organization soon added to the overall Confederate States Army. Seven days later he was commissioned a colonel and given command of the 5th Virginia Infantry, one of the regiments that made up the Stonewall Brigade. Harper and the 5th Virginia fought well during the First Battle of Bull Run on July 21, "where his soldierly ability attracted the notice of the army commander." However, Harper resigned from the Confederate Army on September 11, because Jackson refused to allow Harper permission to return home where his wife lay dying.

Map of 1865's Battle of Waynesboro, Virginia, Harper's last engagement.

Upon returning to the Shenandoah Valley, Augusta County voters again elected Harper to the Virginia House of Delegates, where he served until 1864. On June 2 of that year, after abolitionist Union General David Hunter's raid into the Shenandoah Valley, Harper accepted re-appointment as a colonel in the Confederate Army in order to form a regiment from reservist companies located in the Shenandoah Valley. During the Valley Campaigns of 1864 under General Jubal Early, Confederate raiders destroyed Harper's original hometown, Chambersburg, Pennsylvania, on July 30, 1864, in retaliation for Hunter's campaign as well as its failure to pay ransom. However, Union forces continued to attack the Shenandoah valley. Col. Harper and his troops (under General Early) were routed at the Battle of Piedmont on June 5–6, 1864 and then the Battle of Waynesboro, Virginia on March 2, 1865.

== Postbellum ==
After the conflict, Harper returned home to Staunton in 1865. Two years later he died of pneumonia on Christmas Day at his plantation, "Glen Allen", and was buried in Staunton's Thornrose Cemetery. During his lifetime, Harper was allegedly credited with drawing the attention of Brig. Gen. Bernard E. Bee to Stonewall Jackson's performance during the First Battle of Bull Run, inspiring Jackson's famous sobriquet.

== See also ==
- List of American Civil War generals (Acting Confederate)
- List of mayors of Staunton, Virginia
