= The Hornet's Nest (2014 film) =

- Film poster
- Directed by: David Salzberg; Christian Tureaud
- Produced by: Christian Tureaud; David Salzberg
- Production companies: HighRoad Entertainment; BASE Productions
- Distributed by: Freestyle Releasing
- Release date: May 9, 2014
- Running time: 97 minutes
- Country: United States
- Language: English
- Box office: $307,244

The Hornet's Nest is a 2014 American documentary film about the Afghanistan war, directed and produced by David Salzberg and Christian Tureaud.

The film follows father and son journalists Mike Boettcher and Carlos Boettcher, embedded with a group of United States Army soldiers from 101st Airborne Division sent on a mission into Kunar Province's Barawala Kalay Valley, one of Afghanistan's most hostile valleys. The three-day mission becomes an intense nine days of fighting against the enemy.

== Reception ==
On the review aggregator website Rotten Tomatoes, the film holds an approval rating of 72%, based on 18 reviews, with an average rating of 7.0/10.

== Accolades ==
The Hornet's Nest won the Chairman's Award at the San Diego Film Festival in 2014.
