= Mike Boettcher =

American journalist and war correspondent

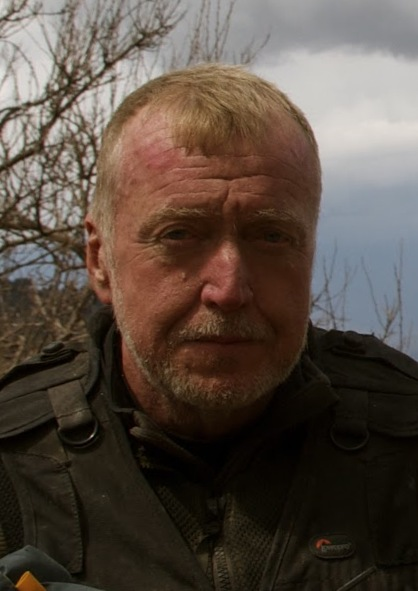
- Mike Boettcher (2019)
- Born: Michael Boettcher; 1954 (age 71–72); Ponca City, Oklahoma, Oklahoma, United States
- Occupations: war reporter, journalist, university professor
- Notable work: The Hornet's Nest

Mike Boettcher (born 1954) is an American journalist and war correspondent. He is often embedded in Iraq and Afghanistan. He is also a visiting professor at the University of Oklahoma. Reporting from Key West, Florida on June 1, 1980, about the Mariel boatlift, he was the first reporter to present a live satellite report from the United States on CNN (coming after Jay Bushinsky's live satellite report from Jerusalem). His work has won a Peabody Award, six Emmys, and a National Headliner award.

Boettcher and his son Carlos produced the 2014 film documentary The Hornet's Nest, depicting their experiences while embedded with American troops in Afghanistan.

Boettcher is a native of Ponca City, Oklahoma and a graduate of the University of Oklahoma.
