= History 101 =

History 101 is a common name for an introductory history course.

History 101 may also refer to:

- History 101 (novel), a 2002 Doctor Who novel
- "History 101" (Community), a 2013 episode of NBC television series Community
- History 101 (TV series), a 2020 Netflix documentary programme

== See also ==
- History of the 101st Airborne Division
- Outline of history
- wikiversity:School:History, a basic course in history
