= History of the 101st Airborne Division =

The 101st Airborne Division ("Screaming Eagles") is a specialized modular light infantry division of the US Army trained for air assault operations. The Screaming Eagles has been referred to by journalists as "the tip of the spear" as well as one of the most potent and tactically mobile of the U.S. Army's divisions. The 101st Airborne Division has a history that is nearly a century long. During World War II, it was renowned for its role in Operation Overlord (the D-Day landings and airborne landings on 6 June 1944, in Normandy, France), Operation Market Garden, the liberation of the Netherlands and its action during the Battle of the Bulge around the city of Bastogne, Belgium. During the Vietnam War, the 101st Airborne Division fought in several major campaigns and battles, including the Battle of Hamburger Hill in May 1969. In mid-1968, it was reorganized and redesignated as an airmobile division and then in 1974 as an air assault division. In recent years, the division has served in Iraq and Afghanistan. At the height of the war on terror, the 101st Airborne Division had over 200 aircraft. The division now has slightly over 100 aircraft.

== World War I and interwar period ==
The 101st Division headquarters was organized 2 November 1918 at Camp Shelby, Mississippi, having been constituted on 23 July in the National Army. World War I ended 9 days later, and was demobilized on 11 December 1918.

In 1921, the division headquarters was reconstituted in the Organized Reserves, and organized on 10 September 1921, at Milwaukee, Wisconsin. It was at this time that the "Screaming Eagle" became associated with the division, as a successor to the traditions of the Wisconsin volunteer regiments of the American Civil War. (See also: Old Abe)

As part of the reorganization of the 101st as an airborne division in the Army of the United States, the reserve division was disbanded on 15 August 1942.

== World War II ==
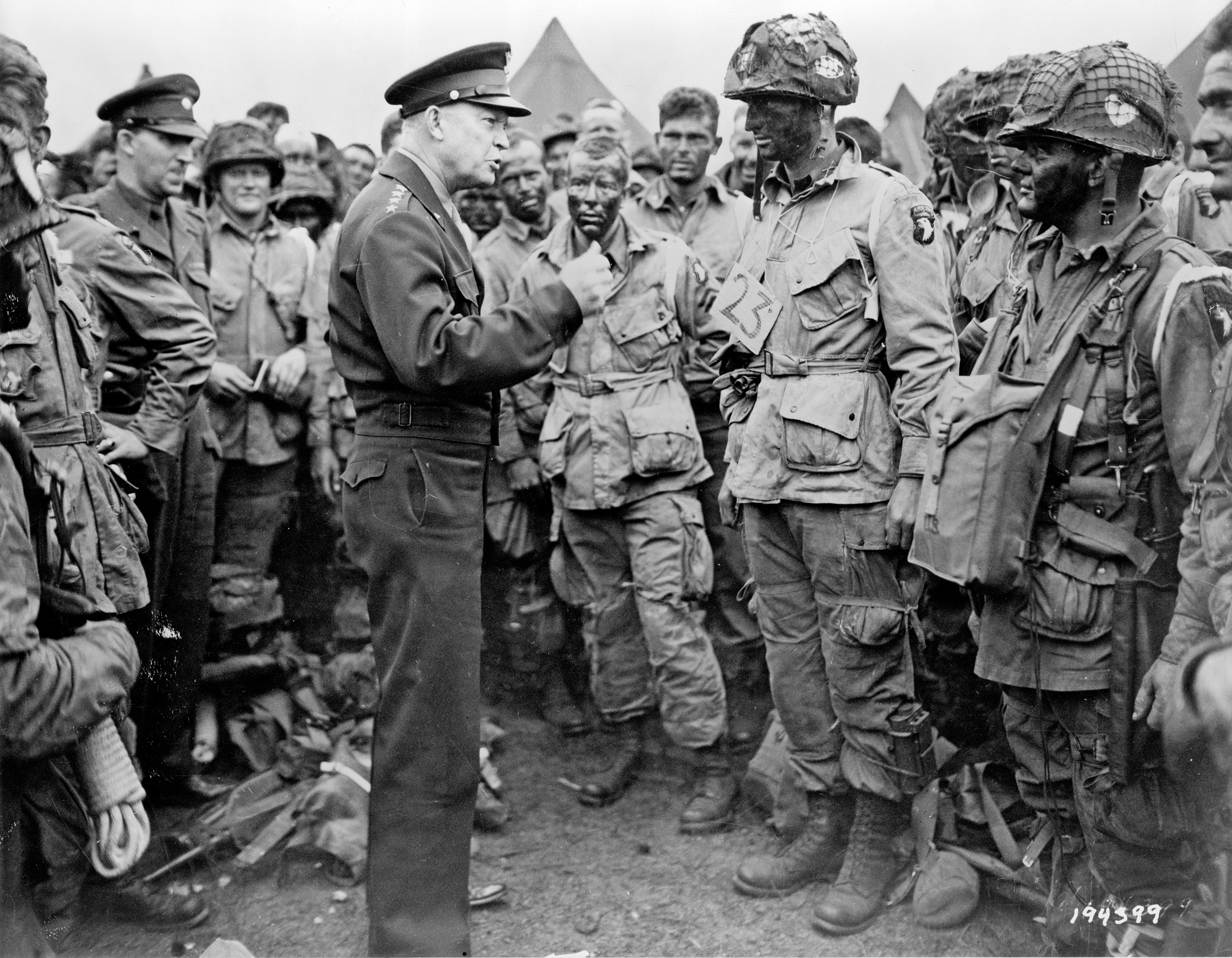
General Dwight D. Eisenhower speaking with 1st Lieutenant Wallace C. Strobel and men of Company E, 502nd Parachute Infantry Regiment on 5 June. The placard around Strobel's neck indicates he is the jumpmaster for chalk No. 23 of the 438th TCG.

On 19 August 1942, its first commander, Major General William C. Lee, read out General Order Number 5:

The 101st Airborne Division, which was activated on 16 August 1942, at Camp Claiborne, Louisiana, has no history, but it has a rendezvous with destiny.

Due to the nature of our armament, and the tactics in which we shall perfect ourselves, we shall be called upon to carry out operations of far-reaching military importance and we shall habitually go into action when the need is immediate and extreme. Let me call your attention to the fact that our badge is the great American eagle. This is a fitting emblem for a division that will crush its enemies by falling upon them like a thunderbolt from the skies.

The history we shall make, the record of high achievement we hope to write in the annals of the American Army and the American people, depends wholly and completely on the men of this division. Each individual, each officer and each enlisted man, must therefore regard himself as a necessary part of a complex and powerful instrument for the overcoming of the enemies of the nation. Each, in his own job, must realize that he is not only a means, but an indispensable means for obtaining the goal of victory. It is, therefore, not too much to say that the future itself, in whose molding we expect to have our share, is in the hands of the soldiers of the 101st Airborne Division.

=== D-Day and aftermath ===
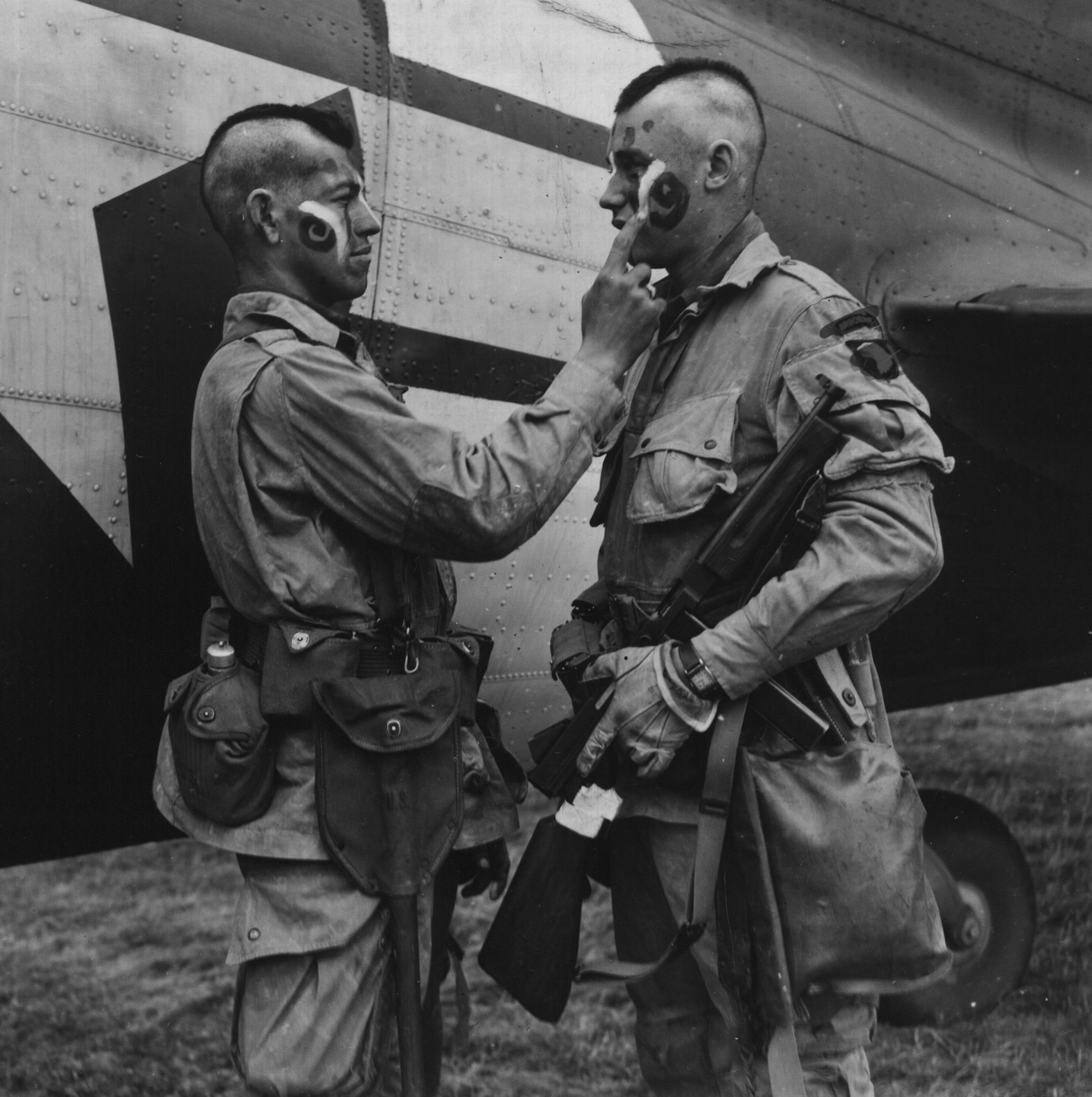
Private Ware applies last second war paint to Private Plaudo in England June 1944.

The pathfinders of the 101st Airborne Division led the way on D-Day in the night drop prior to the invasion. These night drops caused a lot of trouble for the gliders. Many crashed and equipment and personnel were lost. They left from RAF North Witham having trained there with the 82nd Airborne Division.

The 101st Airborne Division's objectives were to secure the four causeway exits behind Utah Beach between St Martin-de-Varreville and Pouppeville to ensure the exit route for the 4th Infantry Division from the beach later that morning. The other objectives included destroying a German coastal artillery battery at Saint-Martin-de-Varreville, capturing buildings nearby at Mésières believed used as barracks and a command post for the artillery battery, capturing the Douve River lock at La Barquette (opposite Carentan), capturing two footbridges spanning the Douve at La Porte opposite Brévands, destroying the highway bridges over the Douve at Saint-Côme-du-Mont, and securing the Douve River valley. Their secondary mission was to protect the southern flank of VII Corps. They destroyed two bridges along the Carentan highway and a railroad bridge just west of it. They gained control of La Barquette locks, and established a bridgehead over Douve River which was located north-east of Carentan.

In the process units also disrupted German communications, established roadblocks to hamper the movement of German reinforcements, established a defensive line between the beachhead and Valognes, cleared the area of the drop zones to the unit boundary at Les Forges, and linked up with the 82nd Airborne Division.

==== Drop Zone Able ====
The paratroopers of the 101st Airborne Division jumped between 0048 and 0140 British Double Summer Time of 6 June. The first wave, inbound to Drop Zone A (the northernmost), was not surprised by the cloud bank and maintained formation, but navigating errors and a lack of Eureka signal caused the first error. Although the 2nd Battalion, 502nd Parachute Infantry Regiment was dropped as a compact unit, it jumped on the wrong drop zone, while its commander, Lt Col. Steve A. Chappuis, came down virtually alone on the correct drop zone. Chappuis and his stick captured the coastal battery soon after assembling, and found that it had already been dismantled after an air raid.

Most of the remainder of the 502nd (70 of 80 sticks) dropped in a disorganized pattern around the impromptu drop zone set up by the pathfinders near the beach. The battalion commanders of the 1st and 3rd Battalions, Lt Col. Patrick J. Cassidy (1/502) and Lt Col. Robert G. Cole (3/502), took charge of small groups and accomplished all of their D-Day missions. Cassidy's group took Saint Martin-de-Varreville by 0630, sent a patrol under S/Sgt. Harrison C. Summers to seize the "XYZ" objective, a barracks at Mésières, and set up a thin line of defense from Foucarville to Beuzeville. Cole's group moved during the night from near Sainte-Mère-Église to the Varreville battery, then continued on and captured Exit 3 at 0730. They held the position during the morning until relieved by troops moving inland from Utah Beach. Both commanders found Exit 4 covered by German artillery fire and Cassidy recommended to the 4th Infantry Division that it not use the exit.

The division's parachute artillery did not fare nearly as well. Its drop was one of the worst of the operation, losing all but one howitzer and dropping all but two of 54 loads four to twenty miles (32 km) to the north, where most ultimately became casualties.

==== Drop Zone Charlie ====
The second wave, assigned to drop the 506th Parachute Infantry Regiment (PIR) on Drop Zone C 1 mile (1.6 km) west of Sainte Marie-du-Mont, was badly dispersed by the clouds, then subjected to intense antiaircraft fire for 10 miles (16 km). Three of the 81 C-47s were lost before or during the jump. One, piloted by 1st Lt. Marvin F. Muir of the 439th Troop Carrier Group, caught fire. Lt. Muir held the aircraft steady while the stick jumped, then died when the plane crashed immediately afterward, for which he was awarded the Distinguished Service Cross. Despite the opposition, the 506th's 1st Battalion (Note: Lt Col. William L. Turner, Colorado. Col. Turner was killed in action the next day) (the original division reserve) was dropped accurately on DZ C, landing two-thirds of its sticks and regimental commander Col. Robert F. Sink on or within a mile of the drop zone.

Most of the 2nd Battalion had jumped too far west, near Sainte-Mère-Église. They eventually assembled near Foucarville at the northern edge of the 101st Airborne's objective area. It fought its way to the hamlet of le Chemin near the Houdienville causeway by mid-afternoon, but found that the 4th Division had already seized the exit hours before. The 3rd Battalion of the 501st PIR, led by Lt Col. Julian J. Ewell (3/501), also assigned to jump onto DZ C, was more scattered, but took over the mission of securing the exits. An ad hoc company-sized team that included division commander Maj. Gen. Maxwell D. Taylor reached the Pouppeville exit at 0600. After a six-hour house-clearing battle with elements of the German 1058th Grenadier Regiment, the group secured the exit shortly before 4th Division troops arrived to link up.

==== Drop Zone Dog ====
The third wave also encountered severe flak, losing six aircraft. The troop carriers still made an accurate drop, placing 94 of 132 sticks on or close to the drop zone, but part of the DZ was covered by pre-registered German machinegun and mortar fire that inflicted heavy casualties before many troops could get out of their chutes. Among the killed were two of the three battalion commanders and the executive officer of the 3/506th. (Note: Lt Col. Robert C. Carroll (1/501), Lt Col. Robert L. Wolverton (3/506th), and Major George S. Grant (3/506))

The surviving battalion commander, Lt Col. Robert A. Ballard, gathered 250 troopers and advanced toward Saint Côme-du-Mont to complete his mission of destroying the highway bridges over the Douve. Less than half a mile from his objective at les Droueries he was stopped by elements of battalion III./1058 Grenadier-Rgt. Another group of 50 men, assembled by the regimental S-3, Major Richard J. Allen, attacked the same area from the east at Basse-Addeville but was also pinned down.

The commander of the 501st PIR, Col. Howard R. Johnson, collected 150 troops and captured the main objective, la Barquette lock, by 0400. After establishing defensive positions, Col. Johnson went back to the DZ and assembled another 100 men, including Allen's group, to reinforce the bridgehead. Despite naval gunfire support from the cruiser Quincy, Ballard's battalion was unable to take Saint Côme-du-Mont or join Col. Johnson. (Note: Col. Johnson was killed in action in the Netherlands on 8 October 1944.)

The S-3 officer of the 3rd Battalion 506th PIR, Capt. Charles G. Shettle, put together a platoon and achieved another objective by seizing two-foot bridges near la Porte at 0430 and crossed to the east bank. When their ammunition drew low after knocking out several machine gun emplacements, the small force withdrew to the west bank. It doubled in size overnight as stragglers came in, and repulsed a German probe across the bridges.

==== Other actions ====
Two other noteworthy actions took place near Sainte Marie-du-Mont by units of the 506th PIR, both of which involved the seizure and destruction of batteries of 105mm guns of the German III Battalion-191st Artillery Regiment. During the morning, a small patrol of troopers from Company E 506th PIR under (then) 1st Lt. Richard D. Winters overwhelmed a force 3–4 times its size and destroyed four guns at a farm called Brécourt Manor, for which Winters was later awarded the Distinguished Service Cross and the assault troops given Silver and Bronze Stars. This was later documented in the book Band of Brothers and the acclaimed miniseries of the same name.

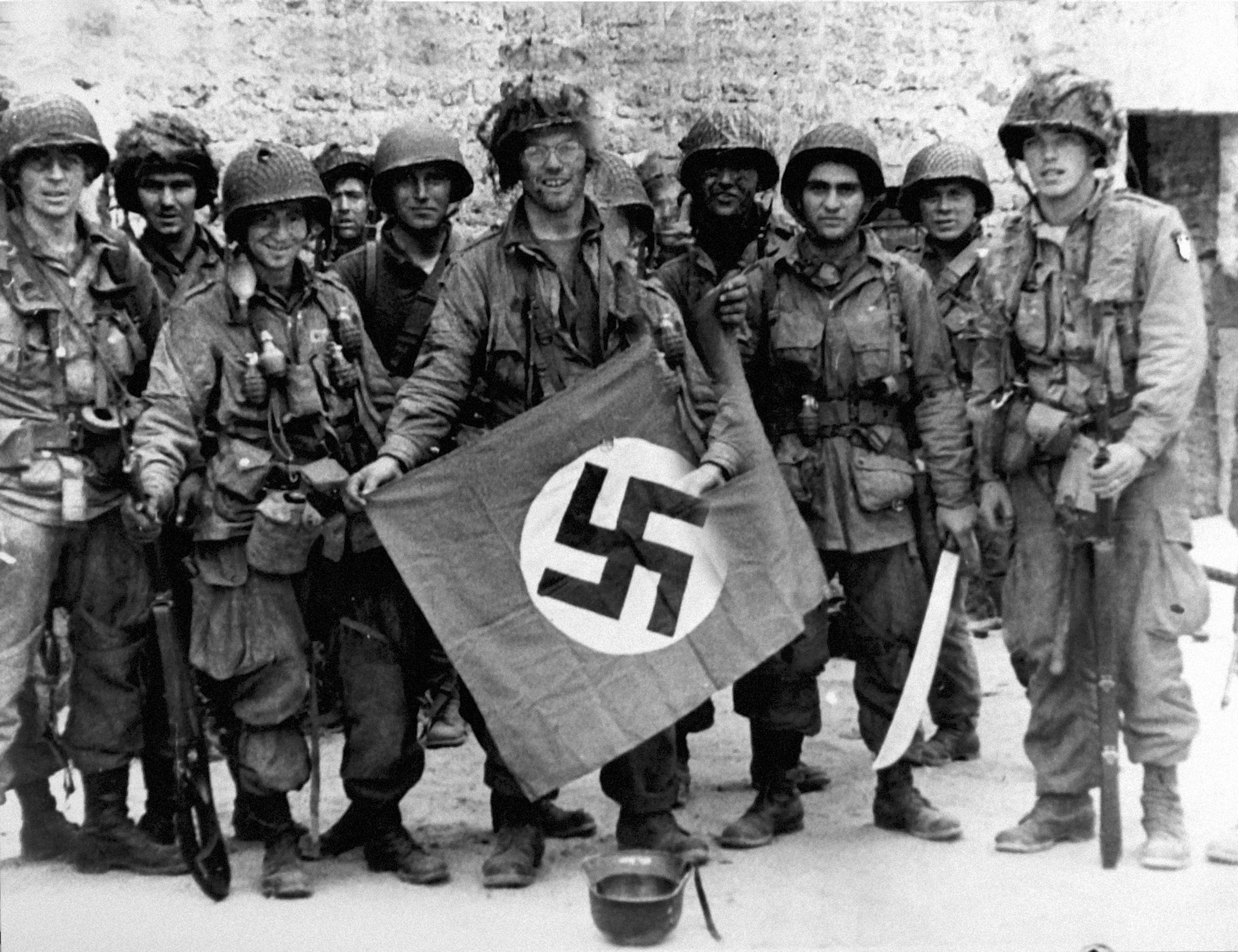
101st Airborne troops posing with a captured Nazi vehicle air identification sign two days after landing at Normandy.

Around noon, while reconnoitering the area by jeep, Col. Sink received word that a second battery of four guns had been discovered at Holdy, a manor between his CP and Sainte Marie-du-Mont, and the defenders had a force of some 70 paratroopers pinned down. Capt. Lloyd E. Patch (Headquarters Company 1st/506th) and Capt. Knut H. Raudstein (Company C 506th PIR) (Note: Patch became acting commander of the 1st Battalion on 7 June, and later commanded the 3/506 as a lieutenant colonel. Both Patch and Raudstein were awarded the DSC.) led an additional 70 troops to Holdy and enveloped the position. The combined force then continued on to seize Sainte Marie-du-Mont. A platoon of the 502nd PIR, left to hold the battery, destroyed three of the four guns before Col. Sink could send four jeeps to save them for the 101st's use.

At the end of D-Day, Gen. Taylor and his division artillery commander Brig. Gen. Anthony C. McAuliffe returned from their foray at Pouppeville. Taylor had control of approximately 2,500 of his 6,600 men, most of whom were in the vicinity of the 506th CP at Culoville, with the thin defense line west of Saint Germain-du-Varreville, or the division reserve at Blosville. Two glider airlifts had brought in scant reinforcements and had resulted in the death of Assistant Division Commander (ADC), Brig. Gen. Don F. Pratt, his neck broken on impact. The 327th Glider Infantry had come across Utah Beach but only its third battalion (1st Battalion 401st GIR) had reported in.

The 101st Airborne Division had accomplished its most important mission of securing the beach exits, but had a tenuous hold on positions near the Douve River, over which the Germans could still move armored units. The three groups clustered there had tenuous contact with each other but none with the rest of the division. A shortage of radio equipment caused by losses during the drops exacerbated his control problems. Taylor made destroying the Douve bridges the division's top priority and delegated the task to Col. Sink, who issued orders for the 1st Battalion 401st Glider Infantry to lead three battalions south the next morning.

As the regular troops moved in from the coast and strengthened the paratrooper positions, many were relieved and sent to the rear to organize for the next big paratroop operation.

==== Operation Market Garden ====
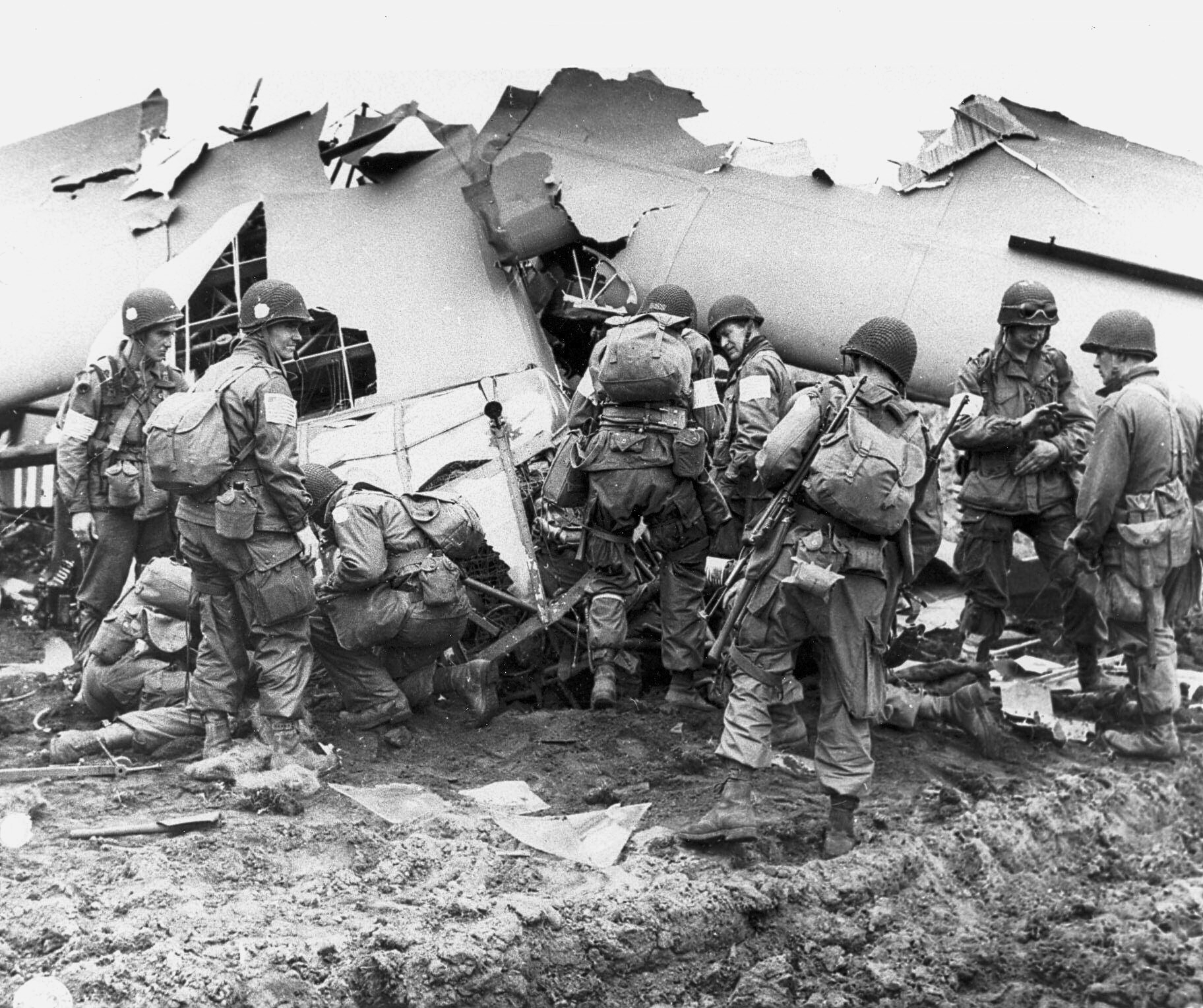
Men of the 101st Airborne Division inspect a broken glider, September 1944.

On 17 September 1944, the 101st Airborne Division became part of XVIII Airborne Corps, under Major General Matthew Ridgway, part of the First Allied Airborne Army, commanded by Lieutenant General Lewis H. Brereton. The division took part in Operation Market Garden (17–25 September 1944), an unsuccessful Allied military operation under Field Marshal Bernard Montgomery, commander of the Anglo-Canadian 21st Army Group, to capture Dutch bridges over the Rhine fought in the Netherlands and the largest airborne operation of all time.

The plan, as outlined by Field Marshal Montgomery, required the seizure by airborne forces of several bridges on the Highway 69 across the Maas (Meuse River) and two arms of the Rhine (the Waal and the Lower Rhine), as well as several smaller canals and tributaries. Crossing these bridges would allow British armoured units to outflank the Siegfried Line, advance into northern Germany, and encircle the Ruhr, Germany's industrial heartland, thus ending the war. This meant the large-scale use of Allied airborne forces, including both the 82nd and 101st Airborne Divisions, along with the British 1st Airborne Division.

The operation was initially successful. Several bridges between Eindhoven and Nijmegen were captured by the 82nd and 101st. The 101st met little resistance and captured most of their initial objectives by the end of 17 September. However, the demolition of the division's primary objective, a bridge over the Wilhelmina Canal at Son, delayed the capture of the main road bridge over the Maas until 20 September. Faced with the loss of the bridge at Son, the 101st unsuccessfully attempted to capture a similar bridge a few kilometers away at Best but found the approach blocked. Other units continued moving to the south and eventually reached the northern end of Eindhoven.

At 06:00 hours on 18 September, the Irish Guards of the British Guards Armoured Division resumed the advance while facing determined resistance from German infantry and tanks. Around noon the 101st Airborne were met by the lead reconnaissance units from British XXX Corps. At 16:00 radio contact alerted the main force that the Son bridge had been destroyed and requested that a replacement Bailey bridge be brought forward. By nightfall the Guards Armoured Division had established itself in the Eindhoven area however transport columns were jammed in the packed streets of the town and were subjected to German aerial bombardment during the night. XXX Corps engineers, supported by German prisoners of war, constructed a class 40 Bailey bridge within 10 hours across the Wilhelmina Canal. The longest sector of the highway secured by the 101st Airborne Division later became known as "Hell's Highway".

==== Battle of the Bulge ====
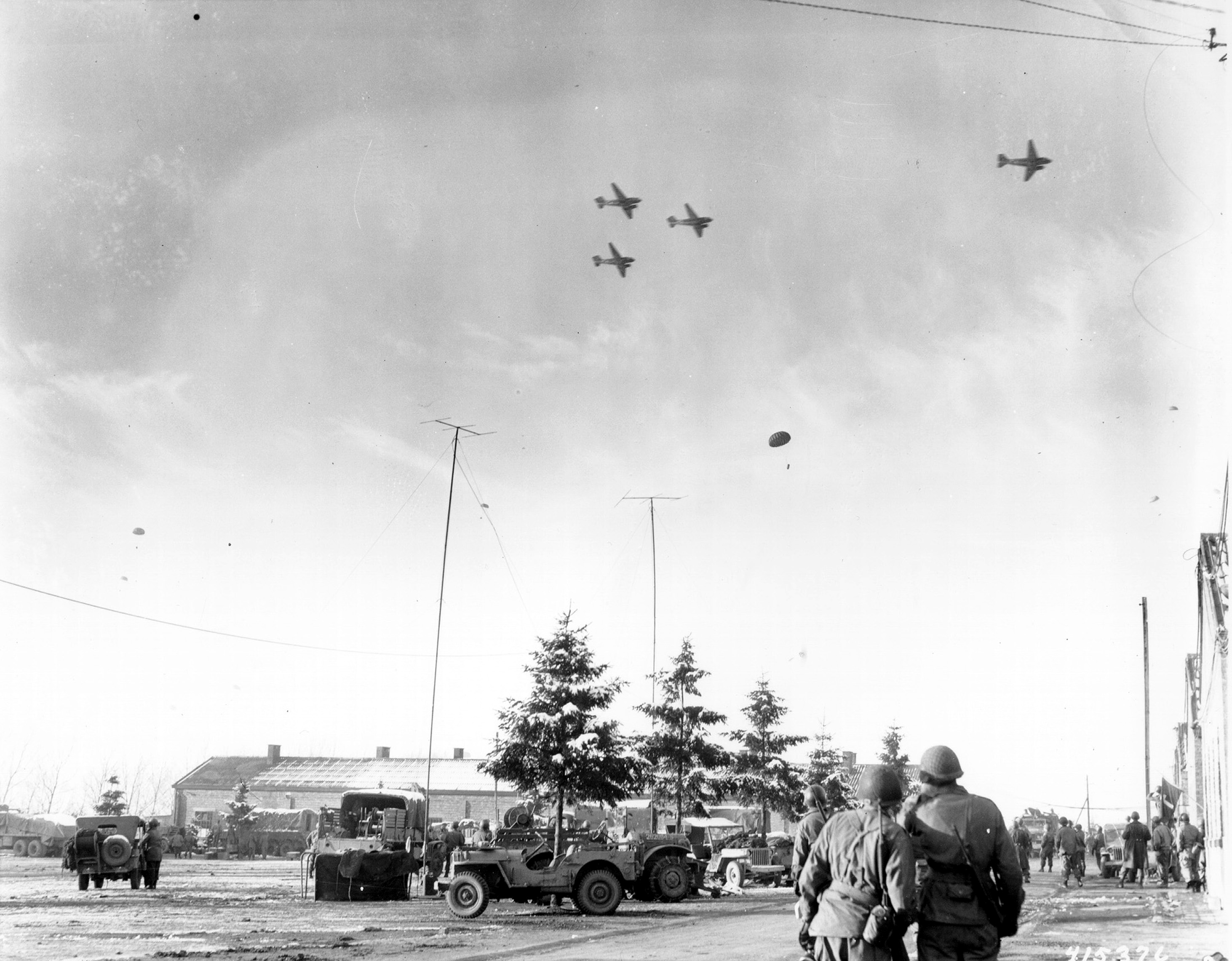
101st Airborne Division troops watch as C-47s drop supplies over Bastogne.

The Ardennes Offensive (16 December 1944 – 25 January 1945) was a major German offensive launched towards the end of World War II through the forested Ardennes Mountains region of Belgium. Germany's planned goal for these operations was to split the British and American Allied line in half, capturing Antwerp, Belgium in the process, and then proceeding to encircle and destroy the entire British 21st Army Group and all 12th U.S. Army Group units north of the German advance, forcing the Western Allies to negotiate a peace treaty in the Axis Powers' favor as a result. In order to reach Antwerp before the Allies could regroup and bring their superior air power to bear, German mechanized forces had to seize all the major highways through eastern Belgium. Because all seven of the main roads in the Ardennes converged on the small town of Bastogne, control of its crossroads was vital to the success or failure of the German attack.

Despite several notable signs in the weeks preceding the attack, the Ardennes Offensive achieved virtually complete surprise. By the end of the second day of battle, it became apparent that the 28th Infantry Division was near collapse. Maj. Gen. Troy H. Middleton, commander of VIII Corps, ordered part of his armored reserve, Combat Command B of the 10th Armored Division to Bastogne. (Note: CCB consisted of the 3rd Tank Battalion, 20th Armored Infantry Battalion, C Company 21st Tank Battalion, B Company 54th Armored Infantry Battalion, C Company 609th Tank Destroyer Battalion, 420th Armored Field Artillery Battalion, and three companies of support troops.) Meanwhile, Gen. Eisenhower ordered forward the SHAEF reserve, composed of the 82nd and 101st Airborne, which were stationed at Reims.

Both divisions were alerted on the evening of 17 December, and not having organic transport, began arranging trucks for movement forward, the weather conditions being unfit for a parachute drop. The 82nd, longer in reserve and thus better re-equipped, moved out first. The 101st left Camp Mourmelon on the afternoon of 18 December, with the order of march the division artillery, division trains, 501st Parachute Infantry Regiment (PIR), 506th PIR, 502nd PIR, and 327th Glider Infantry. Much of the convoy was conducted at night in drizzle and sleet, using headlights despite threat of air attack to speed the movement, and at one point the combined column stretched from Bouillon, Belgium, back to Reims.

The 101st Airborne was routed to Bastogne, located 107 miles (172 km) away on a 1,463 feet (446 m) high plateau, while the 82nd Airborne took up positions further north to block the critical advance of Kampfgruppe Peiper toward Werbomont, Belgium. The 705th Tank Destroyer Battalion, in reserve sixty miles to the north, was ordered to Bastogne to provide anti-tank support to the unprotected 101st Airborne on the 18th and arrived late the next evening. The first elements of the 501st PIR entered the division assembly area four miles west of Bastogne shortly after midnight of 19 December, and by 0900 the entire division had arrived.

By 21 December, the German forces had surrounded Bastogne, which was defended by both the 101st Airborne and Combat Command B of the 10th Armored Division. Conditions inside the perimeter were tough—most of the medical supplies and medical personnel had been captured on 19 December. CCB of the 10th Armored Division, severely weakened by losses in delaying the German advance, formed a mobile "fire brigade" of 40 light and medium tanks (including survivors of CCR of the 9th Armored Division, which had been destroyed while delaying the Germans, and eight replacement tanks found unassigned in Bastogne). Three artillery battalions, including the all-black 969th Field Artillery Battalion, were commandeered by the 101st and formed a temporary artillery group. Each had 12 155 mm howitzers, providing the division with heavy firepower in all directions restricted only by its limited ammunition supply (By 22 December artillery ammunition was restricted to 10 rounds per gun per day.) The weather cleared the next day, however, and supplies (primarily ammunition) were dropped over four of the next five days.

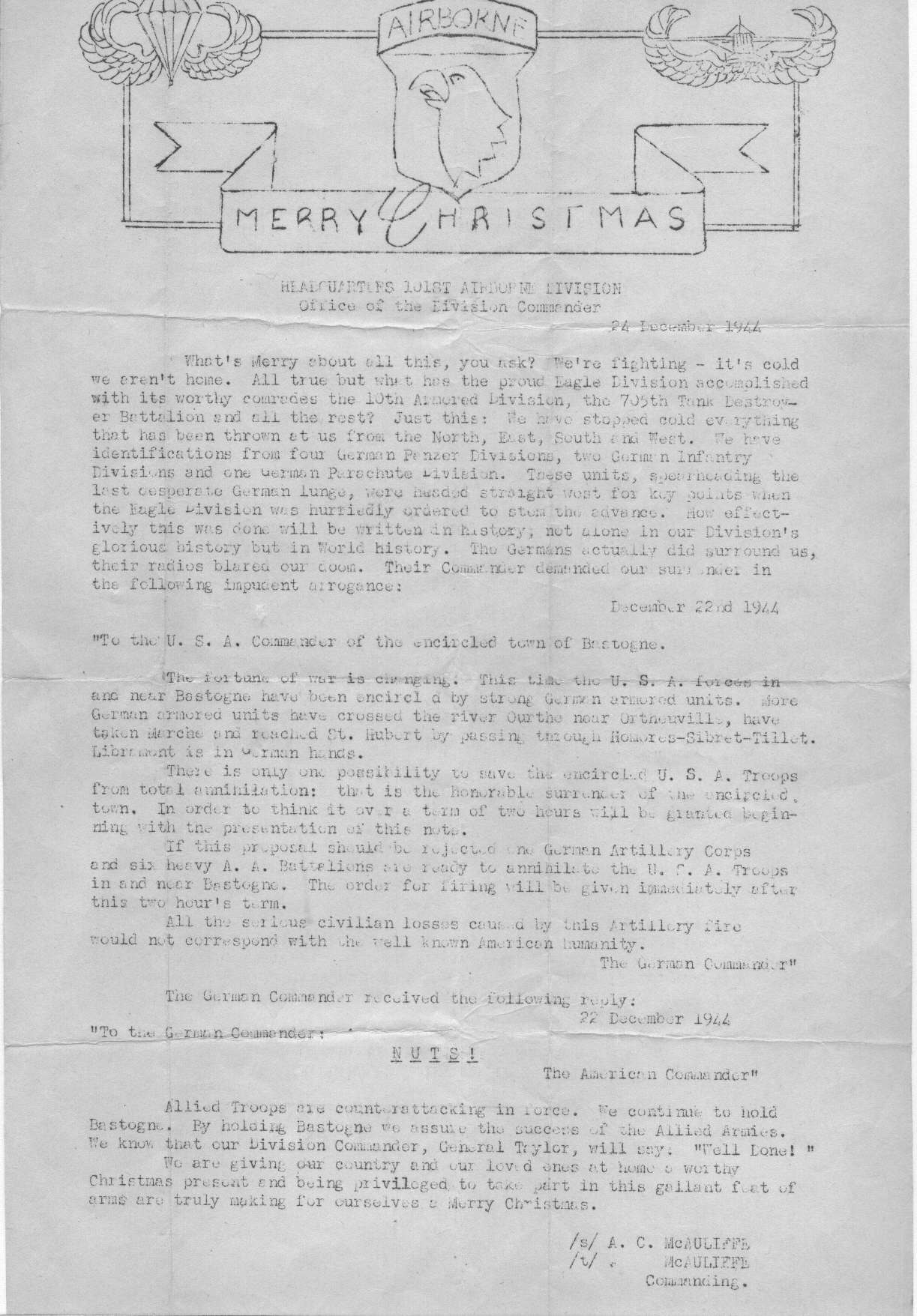
A letter from General McAuliffe on Christmas Day to the 101st Airborne troops defending Bastogne

Despite several determined German attacks, the perimeter held. The German commander, Generalleutnant Heinrich Freiherr von Lüttwitz, requested Bastogne's surrender. When General Anthony McAuliffe, now acting commander of the 101st, was told, and a frustrated McAuliffe responded, "Nuts!" After turning to other pressing issues, his staff reminded him that they should reply to the German demand. One officer, Harry W. O. Kinnard, recommended that McAuliffe's initial reply should be "tough to beat". Thus McAuliffe wrote on the paper delivered to the Germans: "NUTS!" That reply had to be explained, both to the Germans and to non-American Allies. (Note: Nuts can mean several things in American English slang. In this case, however, it signified rejection, and was explained to the Germans as meaning "Go to Hell!")

Both of the two panzer divisions of the XLVII Panzer Corps moved forward from Bastogne after 21 December, leaving only one panzergrenadier regiment of the Panzer-Lehr-Division to assist the 26th Volksgrenadier Division in attempting to capture the crossroads. The 26th VG received additional armor and panzergrenadier reinforcements on Christmas Eve to prepare for its final assault, to take place on Christmas Day. Because it lacked sufficient armor and troops and the 26th VG Division was near exhaustion, the XLVII Panzer Corps concentrated the assault on several individual locations on the west side of perimeter in sequence rather than launching one simultaneous attack on all sides. The assault, despite initial success by German tanks in penetrating the American line, was defeated and virtually all of the German tanks involved were destroyed. The next day, 26 December, the spearhead of General George S. Patton's U.S. Third Army relief force, the 4th Armored Division, broke through the German lines and opened a corridor to Bastogne, ending the siege. The division got the nickname "The Battered Bastards of the Bastion of Bastogne".

With the encirclement broken, the men of the 101st expected to be relieved, but were given orders to resume the offensive. The 506th attacked north and recaptured Recogne on 9 January 1945, the Bois des Corbeaux (Corbeaux Wood), to the right of Easy Company, on 10 January, and Foy on 13 January. The 327th attacked towards Bourcy, northeast of Bastogne, on 13 January and encountered stubborn resistance. The 101st Airborne Division faced German military units as 1st SS Panzer Division Leibstandarte SS Adolf Hitler, Führerbegleitbrigade, 12th SS Panzer Division Hitlerjugend, and the 9th SS Panzer Division Hohenstaufen. The 506th retook Noville on 15 January and Rachamps the next day. The 502nd reinforced the 327th, and the two regiments captured Bourcy on 17 January, pushing the Germans back to their point of advance on the day the division had arrived in Bastogne. The next day the 101st Airborne Division was relieved.

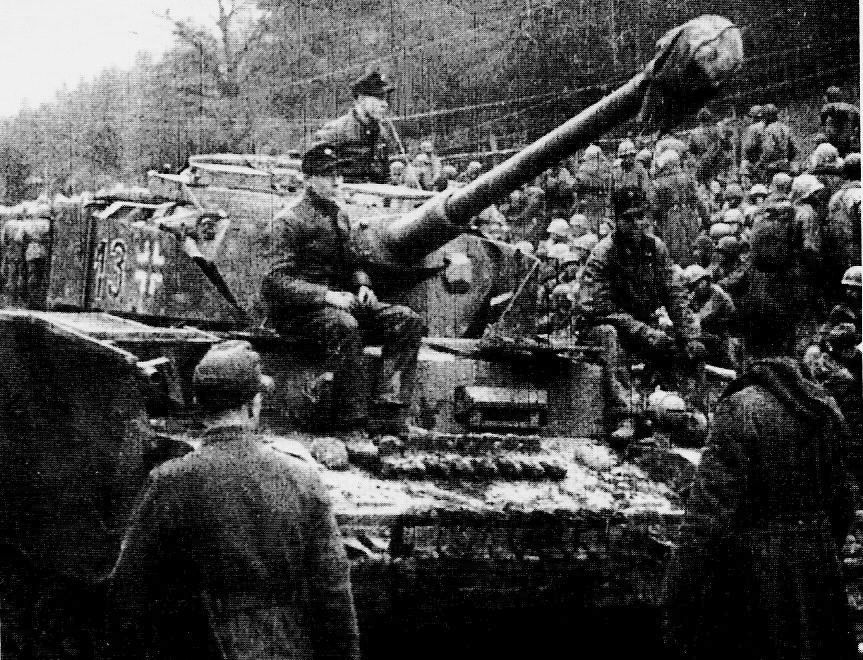
A Panzer IV of Kampgruppe Peiper of the 1st SS Panzer Division Leibstandarte SS Adolf Hitler. The 101st Airborne Division fought this Waffen SS division when the 101st attacked towards Bourcy, northeast of Bastogne, on 13 January 1945.

==== Liberation of Kaufering ====
In April 1945, the 101st moved into the Rhineland and eventually reached the Bavarian Alps. As the 101st drove into Southern Germany they found Kaufering IV, one of the camps in the Kaufering complex. When the 12th Armored Division and the 101st arrived at Kaufering IV in late April 1945, the soldiers found over 500 dead inmates. The Army ordered the local townspeople to bury the dead.

==== Casualties ====
- Total battle casualties: 9,328
- Killed in action: 1,766
- Wounded in action: 6,388
- Missing in action: 207
- Prisoner of war: 967

=== Post-War ===
On 1 August 1945, the 501st PIR was moved to France while the rest of the division was based around Zell am See and Kaprun in the Austrian alps. Some units within the division began training for redeployment to the Pacific Theatre of War but the war ended before they were needed. The division was inactivated 30 November 1945. For their efforts during World War II, the 101st Airborne Division was awarded four campaign streamers and two Presidential Unit Citations.

=== Units ===
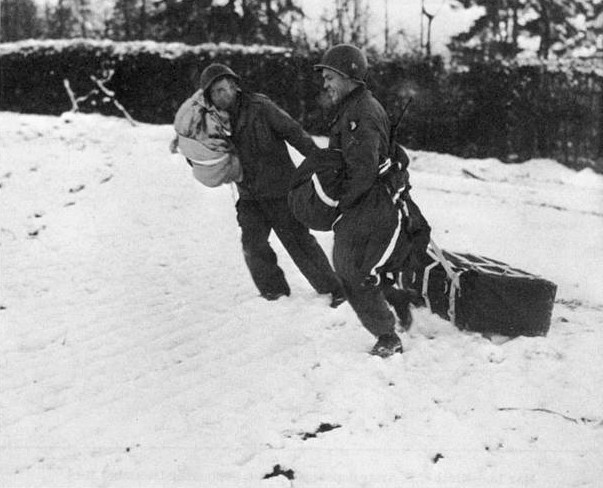
101st Airborne troops retrieving air dropped supplies during the siege of Bastogne.

- Division Headquarters
- 327th Glider Infantry Regiment
- 401st Glider Infantry Regiment, disbanded 1 March 1945 in France; assets to 327th GIR
- 501st Parachute Infantry Regiment, attached 1 May 1944 – past 9 May 1945
- 502nd Parachute Infantry Regiment
- 506th Parachute Infantry Regiment, assigned 1 March 1945, previously attached 15 September 1943 – 1 March 1945
- HHB, Division Artillery
  - 321st Glider Field Artillery Battalion (75 mm)
  - 377th Parachute Field Artillery Battalion (75 mm)
  - 463d Parachute Field Artillery Battalion (75mm)
  - 907th Glider Field Artillery Battalion (75 mm)
- 81st Airborne Antiaircraft Battalion
- 326th Airborne Engineer Battalion
- 326th Airborne Medical Company
- 101st Parachute Maintenance Company
- 101st Signal Company
- 101st Counter Intelligence Corps Detachment
- Headquarters, Special Troops
  - 801st Airborne Ordnance Maintenance Company
  - 426th Airborne Quartermaster Company
  - Headquarters Company, 101st Airborne Division
  - Military Police Platoon
  - Reconnaissance Platoon
  - Band (assigned on 1 March 1945 reorganization)

Source: Order of Battle: U.S. Army World War II by Shelby Stanton, Presidio Press, 1984.

=== Helmet insignia ===
The 101st was distinguished partly by its tactical helmet insignia. Card suits (diamonds, spades, hearts, and clubs) on each side of the helmet denoted the regiment to which a soldier belonged. The only exception was the 187th, who were added to the division later. Divisional headquarters and support units were denoted by use of a square and divisional artillery by a circle. Tick marks at 3, 6, and 9 o'clock indicated to which battalion the individual belonged, while the tick mark at 12 o'clock indicated a headquarters or headquarters company assignment.

- These insignia were first seen in World War II, and can still be seen on 101st Division soldiers today.
  - 327th: Clubs (♣) (Currently worn by the 1st Brigade Combat Team; depicted in 1949 film Battleground)
  - 501st: Diamonds (♦) (Currently 1st Battalion, 501st Infantry Regiment is part of the 4th Brigade (ABN), 25th Infantry Division in Alaska.) (The diamond is currently used by both 1st Battalion, 501st Infantry Regiment and the 101st Combat Aviation Brigade)
  - 502d: Hearts (♥) (Currently worn by the 2nd Brigade Combat Team)
  - 506th: Spades (♠) (Formerly worn by 4th Brigade Combat Team before their deactivation in 2014; depicted in the mini-series Band of Brothers; currently worn by 1st and 2nd Battalion of the 506th Infantry Regiment)
  - 187th: Torii (Currently worn by the 3rd Brigade Combat Team; not during World War II, when the 187th Infantry Regiment was part of the 11th Airborne Division.)

== Post World War II era ==
=== Postwar training and Pentomic reactivation ===
The 101st Airborne was allotted to the Regular Army in June 1948 and reactivated as a training unit at Camp Breckenridge, Kentucky the following July, only to be deactivated the next year. It was reactivated in 1950 following the outbreak of the Korean War, again to serve as a Training Center at Camp Breckenridge until inactivated in December 1953. During this time it included the 53rd Airborne Infantry Regiment.

It was reactivated again in May 1954 at Fort Jackson, South Carolina and in March 1956, the 101st was transferred, less personnel and equipment, to Fort Campbell, Kentucky, to be reorganized as a combat division. Using the personnel and equipment of the 187th ARCT and the 508th ARCT, the 101st was reactivated as the first "pentomic" division with five battle groups in place of its World War II structure that included regiments and battalions. The reorganization was in place by late April 1957 and the division's battle groups were:

- 2nd Airborne Battle Group, 187th Infantry
- 1st Airborne Battle Group, 327th Infantry
- 1st Airborne Battle Group, 501st Infantry
- 1st Airborne Battle Group, 502nd Infantry
- 1st Airborne Battle Group, 506th Infantry

Division artillery consisted of the following units:

- Battery D, 319th Artillery
- Battery E, 319th Artillery
- Battery A, 321st Artillery
- Battery B, 321st Artillery
- Battery C, 321st Artillery
- Battery A, 377th Artillery

Other supporting units were also assigned.

=== Civil rights ===
The "Little Rock Nine" were a group of African-American students who were enrolled in Little Rock Central High School in September 1957, as a result of the U.S. Supreme Court's ruling in the historic Brown v. Board of Education case. Elements of the division's 1st Airborne Battle Group, 327th Infantry were ordered to Little Rock by President Eisenhower to escort the students into the formerly segregated school during the crisis. The division was under the command of Major General Edwin Walker, who was committed to protecting the black students. The troops were deployed from September until Thanksgiving 1957, when Task Force 153rd Infantry, (federalized Arkansas Army National Guard) which had also been on duty at the school since 24 September, assumed the responsibility.

=== STRAC ===
In 1958 the US Army formed the Strategic Army Corps consisting of the 101st and 82nd Airborne Divisions and the 1st and 4th Infantry Divisions with a mission of rapid deployment on short notice.

=== Vietnam War ===
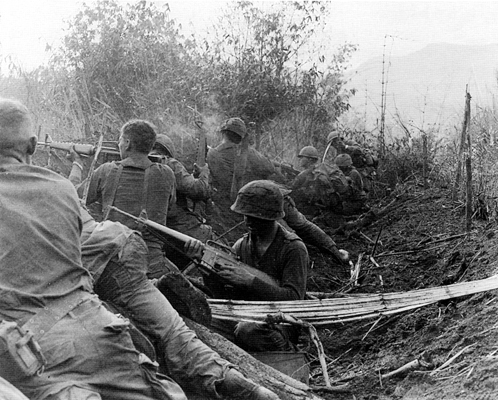
Men of the 1st Brigade, 101st Airborne Division, fire from old Viet Cong trenches.

On 29 July 1965, the 1st Brigade deployed to II Corps, Republic of Vietnam with the following units:

- 1st Battalion, 327th Infantry
- 2nd Battalion, 327th Infantry
- 2nd Battalion, 502nd Infantry
- 2nd Battalion, 320th Artillery
- Troop A, 2nd Squadron 17th Cavalry
- 101st Support Battalion (Provisional)
- Company A, 326th Engineer Battalion
- Company D, 326th Medical Battalion
- Company B, 501st Signal Battalion
- 20th Chemical Detachment
- 181st Military Intelligence Detachment
- 406th Army Security Agency Detachment

Source: Vietnam Order of Battle by Shelby Stanton, published by Galahad Books, 1987.

In May 1967 the 1st Brigade operated as part of Task Force Oregon.

The rest of the 101st was deployed to Vietnam in November 1967 and the 1st Brigade rejoined its parent Division. The 101st was deployed in the northern I Corps region operating against the People's Army of Vietnam (PAVN) infiltration routes through Laos and the A Shau Valley for most of the war. In almost seven years of combat in Vietnam, elements of the 101st participated in 15 campaigns. Notable among these were the Battle of Hamburger Hill in 1969 and Firebase Ripcord in 1970.

The 101st Airborne were called the "Chicken Men" by the North Vietnamese because of their insignia. (The Vietnamese had never seen an eagle before.) Enemy commanders are said to have warned their men to avoid the Chicken Men at all costs because they were sure to lose any engagement with them. One of the opponents of the 101st Airborne Division commented that of all the American organizations he opposed that the 101st Airborne was the one he feared the most.

Within the United States, the 101st, along with the 82nd Airborne Division, was sent in to quell the large and violent 1967 Detroit riot.

=== 1st Brigade ===
From 1965 to 1967, the 1st brigade operated independently as sort of a fire brigade and earned the reputation as being called the "Nomads of Vietnam." They literally fought in every area of Vietnam from the [demilitarized zone] up north all the way down to the central highlands.

==== Tiger Force ====
Tiger Force was the nickname of a long-range reconnaissance patrol unit of the 1st Battalion (Airborne), 327th Infantry Regiment, 1st Brigade (Separate), 101st Airborne Division, which fought in the Vietnam War.

The platoon-sized unit, approximately 45 paratroopers, was founded by Colonel David Hackworth in November 1965 to "outguerrilla the guerrillas". Tiger Force (Recon) 1/327th was a highly decorated small unit in Vietnam, and paid for its reputation with heavy casualties. In October 1968, Tiger Force's parent battalion was awarded the Presidential Unit Citation by President Lyndon B. Johnson, which included a mention of Tiger Force's service at Đắk Tô in June 1966.

The unit was accused of committing multiple war crimes. Investigators concluded that many of the war crimes indeed took place. Despite this, the Army decided not to pursue any prosecutions.

By the end of the Vietnam war Tiger Force killed approximately 1,000 enemy soldiers.

==== Firebase Ripcord ====
On 12 March 1970, the 3rd Brigade of 101st began rebuilding abandoned Fire Support Base Ripcord which relied, as with most remote bases at the time, on a helicopter lifeline to get supplies in and the personnel out. The firebase was to be used for a planned offensive by the 101st to destroy PAVN supply bases in the mountains overlooking the A Shau Valley.

As the 101st Airborne planned the attack on the PAVN supply bases, the PAVN was secretly observing their activities. From 12 March until 30 June, the PAVN was sporadically attacking the Firebase. After weeks of reconnaissance by the PAVN, on the morning of 1 July 1970 the PAVN launched a surprise mortar attack on the Firebase. The resulting 23-day battle between the 101st Airborne and the PAVN was the last major confrontation between United States ground forces and North Vietnam of the Vietnam War.

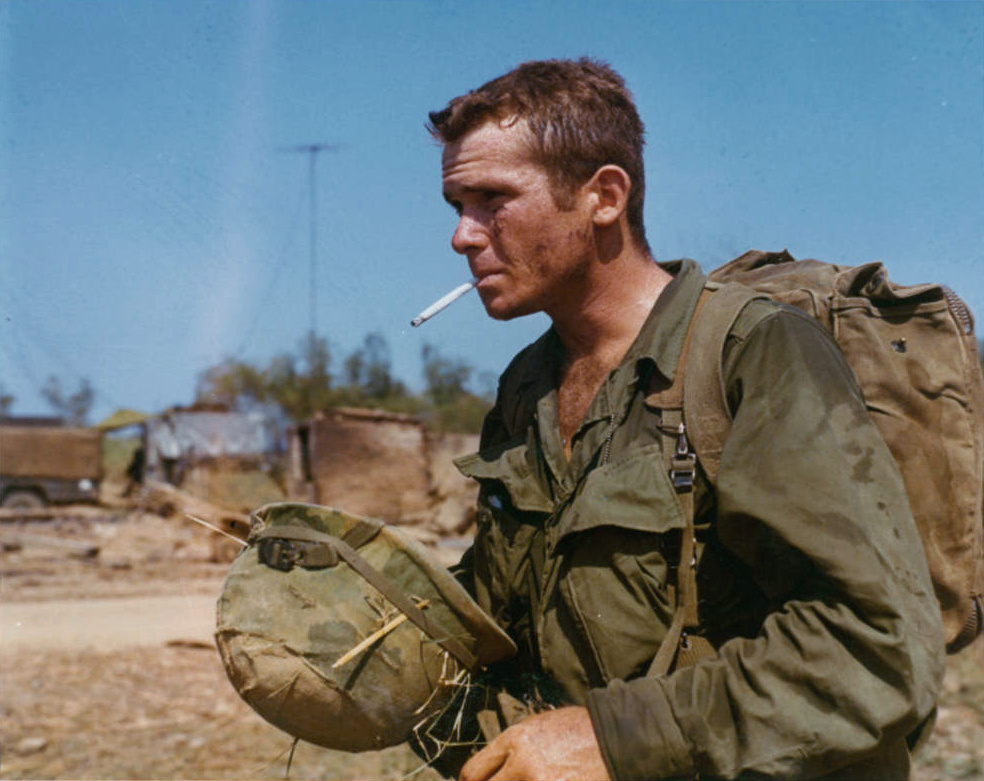
Private Chale after an all-night ambush patrol.

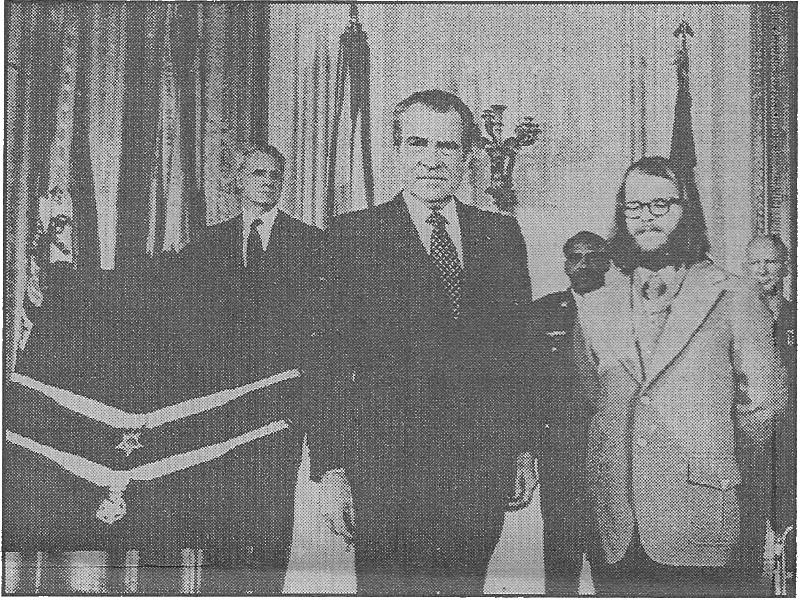
Kenny Kays receives the Medal of Honor from Richard Nixon

During the 23-day siege, 75 US servicemen were killed in action, including 2nd Battalion, 506th Infantry commanding officer Colonel Andre Lucas, who was posthumously awarded the Medal of Honor, and 1st Lt. Bob Kalsu, one of the few American professional athletes to be killed during the war. During the entire battle (including the siege), 250 members of the division were killed.

Fighting from four hilltops, surrounded, and outnumbered nearly ten to one, the division's forces were defeated but managed to inflict heavy losses on the enemy before an aerial withdrawal was ordered on 23 July 1970 while under heavy mortar, anti-aircraft, and small arms fire, ending the siege. After the division withdrew from the firebase, USAF B-52 heavy bombers were sent in to carpet bomb the area.

==== Lam Son 719 ====
In 1971, elements of the division supported the ARVN Operation Lam Son 719, the invasion of southern Laos, but only aviation units actually entered Laos.

In the seven years that all or part of the division served in Vietnam it suffered 4,011 killed in action and 18,259 wounded in action.

The division, during this time, participated in 12 separate campaigns and 17 of the division's Medal of Honor recipients are from this period of time – all this giving the 101st Airborne Division a combat record unmatched by any other division.

=== Post-Vietnam ===
In 1968, the 101st took on the structure and equipment of an airmobile division. Following its return from Vietnam, the division was rebuilt with one brigade (3d) and supporting elements on jump status, using the assets of what had been the 173rd Airborne Brigade. The remaining two brigades and supporting units were organized as airmobile. With the exception of certain specialized units, such as the pathfinders and parachute riggers, in early 1974 the Army terminated jump status for the division. Concurrently the 101st introduced the Airmobile Badge (renamed later that year as the Air Assault Badge), the design of which was based on the Glider Badge of World War II. Initially the badge was only authorized for wear while assigned to the division, but in 1978 the Army authorized it for service-wide wear. Soldiers continued to wear the garrison cap with glider patch, bloused boots, and the cloth wing oval behind their wings, as had division paratroopers before them. A blue beret was authorized for the division in March or April 1975 and worn until revoked at the end of 1979.

The division also was authorized to wear a full color (white eagle) shoulder patch insignia instead of the subdued green eagle shoulder patch that was worn as a combat patch by soldiers who fought with the 101st in Vietnam. While serving with the 101st, it was also acceptable to wear a non-subdued patch as a combat patch, a distinction shared with the 1st and 5th Infantry divisions.

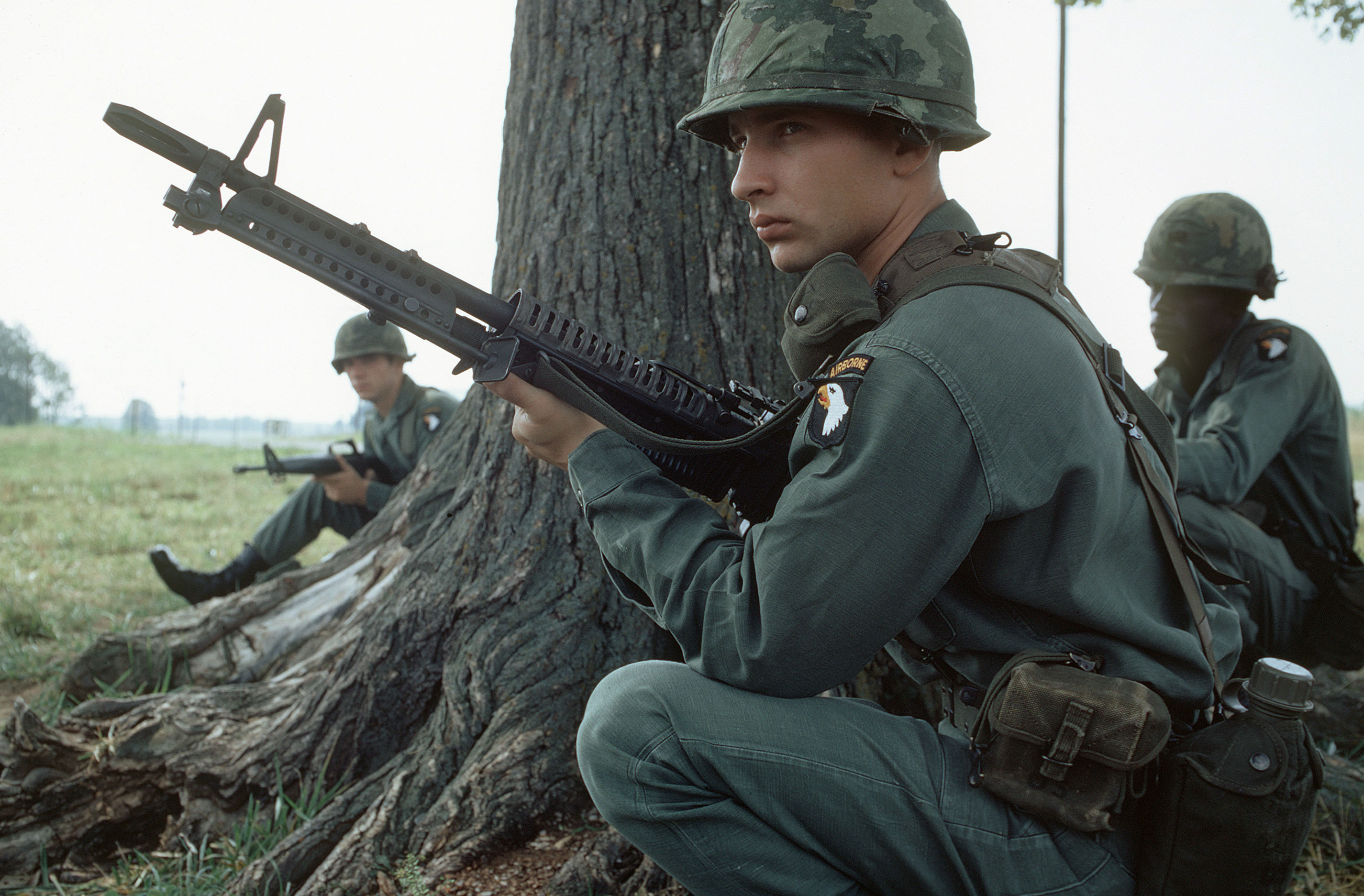
A member of the 101st Airborne Division, armed with an M60 machine gun, participates in a field exercise in 1972. M16A1 rifle in background with each soldier wearing an M1 helmet.

In the late 1970s, the division maintained one battalion on a rotating basis as the division ready force (DRF). The force was in place to respond to alerts for action anywhere in the world. After alert notification, troopers of the "hot" platoon/company, would be airborne, "wheels-up" within 30 minutes as the first responding unit. All other companies of the battalion would follow within one hour. Within 24 hours there would be one brigade deployed to the affected area, with the remainder of the division deploying as needed.

In September 1980, 1st Battalion, 502nd Infantry, 2nd Brigade, took part in Operation Bright Star '80, an exercise deployment to Egypt. In 1984, the command group formed a full-time team, the "Screaming Eagles", Command Parachute Demonstration Team. However the team traces its history to the late 1950s, during the infancy of precision free fall. By 2017, though, the parachute demonstration team had been disbanded.

On 12 December 1985, a civilian aircraft, Arrow Air Flight 1285, chartered to transport some of the division from peacekeeping duty with the Multinational Force and Observers on the Sinai Peninsula to Kentucky, crashed just a short distance from Gander International Airport, Gander, Newfoundland. All eight air crew members and 248 US servicemen died, most were from the 3d Battalion, 502d Infantry. Canadian Transportation Accident Investigation and Safety Board investigators were unable to determine the exact sequence of events which led to the accident, but concluded that the probable cause was icing. At the time it was 17th most disastrous aviation accident in terms of fatalities. President Ronald Reagan and his wife Nancy traveled to Fort Campbell to comfort grieving family members.

On 8 March 1988, two US Army Blackhawk helicopters assigned to the 101st Aviation Brigade collided while on a night training mission at Fort Campbell. All 17 soldiers aboard were killed. The dead included four helicopter crewmen and 13 members of the 502d Infantry Regiment. The Army's accident investigation attributed the crash to pilot error, aircraft design, and the limited field of view afforded pilots using night vision goggles (NVGs). Numerous improvements have been made in NVG technology since the accident occurred.

=== Air Assault Operations ===
In 1974 the 101st Airborne was reorganized as an air assault division. The foundation of modern-day air assault operations was laid by the World War Two era German Fallschirmjäger, Brandenburgers, and the 22nd Air Landing Division glider borne paras laid the foundation for modern day Air Assault operations. In 1941 the U.S. Army quickly adopted this concept of offensive operations initially utilizing wooden gliders before the development of helicopters. Air Assault operations consist of highly mobile teams covering extensive distances and engaging enemy forces behind enemy lines and often by surprise, as they are usually masked by darkness.

The 101st Airborne has earned a place in the U.S. Army's new battlefield doctrine called AirLand Battle. This doctrine is based on belief that initiative, depth, agility, and synchronization successfully complete a mission. First all soldiers are encouraged to take the initiative to seize and exploit opportunities to gain advantages over the enemy. Second, commanders are urged to utilize the entire depth of the battlefield and strike at rear targets that support frontline enemy troops. Third, agility requires commanders to strike the enemy quickly where most vulnerable and to respond to the enemy's strengths. Fourth, synchronization calls for the commander to maximize available combined arms firepower for critical targets to achieve the greatest effect.

=== Persian Gulf War ===
Ground operations during Operation Desert Storm, with the 101st Airborne Division positioned at the left flank.

On 17 January 1991 the 101st Aviation Regiment, fired the first shots of the war when eight AH-64 helicopters successfully destroyed two Iraqi early warning radar sites. In February 1991, the 101st once again had its "Rendezvous with Destiny" in Iraq during the combat air assault into enemy territory. The 101st Airborne Division had struck 155 miles behind enemy lines. It was the deepest air assault operation in history.

Approximately 400 helicopters transported 2,000 soldiers into Iraq where they destroyed Iraqi columns trying to flee westward and prevented the escape of Iraqi forces. The Screaming Eagles would travel an additional fifty to sixty miles into Iraq. By nightfall, the 101st cut off Highway 8 which was a vital supply line running between Basra and the Iraqi forces. The 101st had lost 16 soldiers in action during the 100-hour war and captured thousands of enemy prisoners of war.

=== Humanitarian aid ===
The division has supported humanitarian relief efforts in Rwanda and Somalia, then later supplied peacekeepers to Haiti and Bosnia.

=== Kosovo ===
In February 2000 through August 2000 3rd Brigade 1/187 deployed to Kosovo for peacekeeping operations as a part of Task Force Falcon in support of Operation Joint Guardian.

In August 2000, the 2nd Battalion, 327th Infantry Regiment, as well as some elements from the 502nd Infantry Regiment, helped secure the peace in Kosovo and support the October elections for the formation of the new Kosovo government.

=== Montana forest fires ===
In September and October 2000, the 3rd Battalion, 327th Infantry Regiment, helped fight fires on the Bitterroot National Forest in Montana. Designated Task Force Battle Force and commanded by Lieutenant Colonel Jon S. Lehr, the battalion fought fires throughout the surrounding areas of their Valley Complex near Darby, Montana.

=== Operation Enduring Freedom ===
The 101st Airborne Division (Air Assault) was the first unit to deploy in support of the American war on terrorism. The 101st proved to be very flexible. The 101st Airborne (Air Assault) Division brigade that was used in Afghanistan was used pretty much for counterinsurgency type operations: in other words, they did raids, they did ambushes, they did patrolling, they did a few combat air assaults.

The 2d Brigade, "Strike", built around the 502d Infantry, was largely deployed to Kosovo on peacekeeping operations, with some elements of 3rd Battalion, 502nd, deploying after 9/11 as a security element in the U.S. CENTCOM AOR with the Fort Campbell-based 5th Special Forces Group.

The division quickly deployed its 3rd Brigade, the 187th Infantry's Rakkasans, as the first conventional unit to fight as part of Operation Enduring Freedom.

After an intense period of combat in rugged Shoh-I-Khot Mountains of eastern Afghanistan during Operation Anaconda with elements of the 10th Mountain Division, the Rakkasans redeployed to Fort Campbell only to find the 101st awaiting another deployment order. In 2008, the 101st 4th BCT Red and White "Currahee" including the 1st and the 2nd Battalions, 506th Infantry were deployed to Afghanistan. Elements of 1st Battalion, 506th Infantry Regiment participated in joint operations with U.S. Army Special Forces particularly in the Northern province of Kapisa in the outpost Forward Operating Base (FOB) Kutchsbach. Charlie Company, 2nd Battalion, 506th Infantry Regiment performed joint operations with 5th Special Forces Group and 20th Special Forces Group in 2011. The 101st Combat Aviation Brigade deployed to Afghanistan as Task Force Destiny in early 2008 to Bagram Air Base. 159th Combat Aviation Brigade deployed as Task Force Thunder for 12 months in early 2009, and again in early 2011.

In March 2010, the 101st Combat Aviation Brigade deployed again to Afghanistan as Task Force Destiny to Kandahar Airfield to be the aviation asset in southern Afghanistan.

=== Operation Iraqi Freedom ===
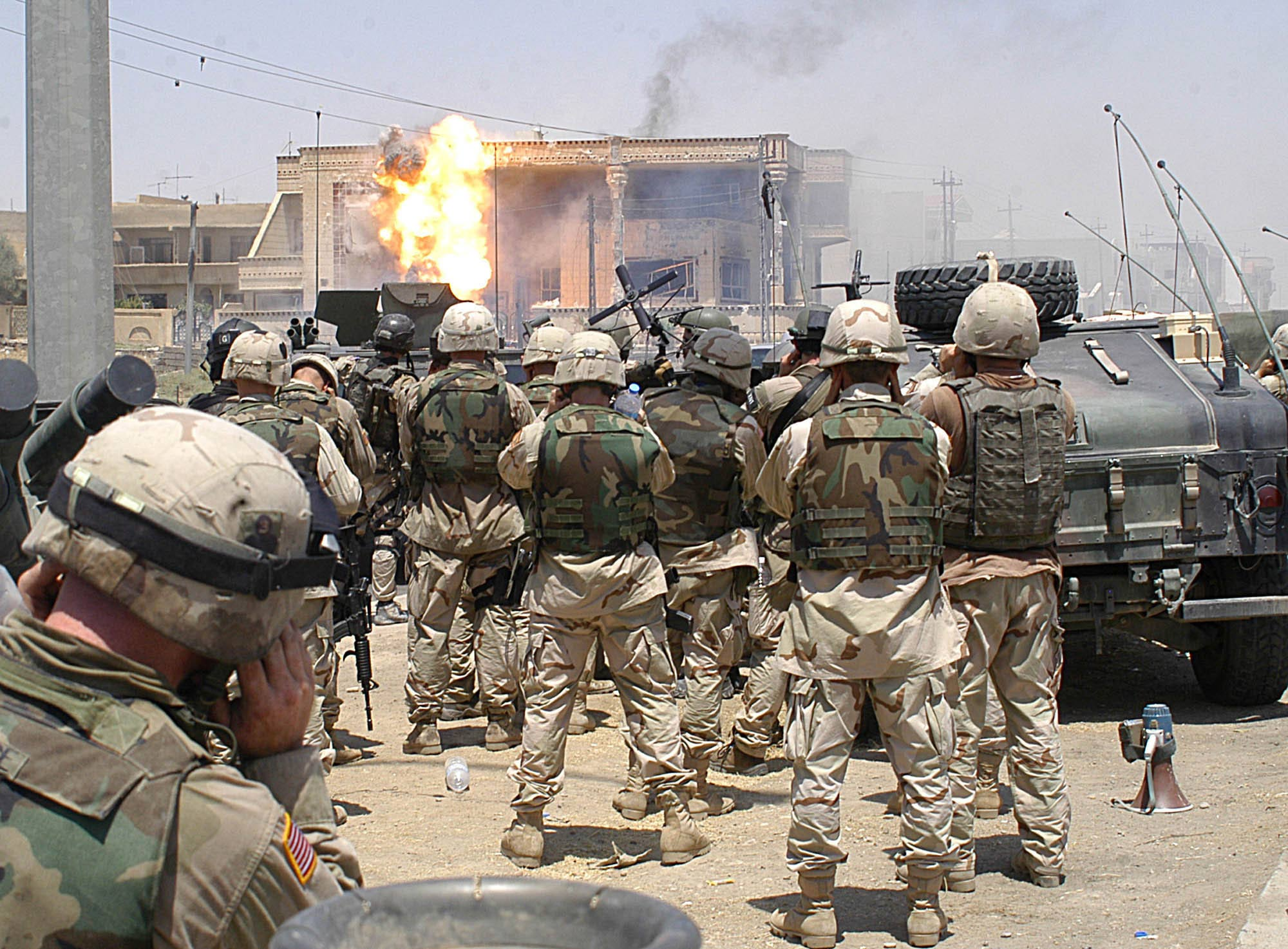
3rd Battalion, 327th Infantry Regiment alongside Task Force 121 at Uday and Qusay Hussein's hideout.

In 2003, Major General David H. Petraeus ("Eagle 6") led the Screaming Eagles to war during the 2003 invasion of Iraq (Operation Iraqi Freedom). General Petraeus led the division into Iraq saying, "Guidons, Guidons. This is Eagle 6. The 101st Airborne Division's next Rendezvous with Destiny is North to Baghdad. Op-Ord Desert Eagle 2 is now in effect. Godspeed. Air Assault. Out." The division was in V Corps, providing support to the 3rd Infantry Division by clearing Iraqi strong points which that division had bypassed. 3rd Battalion, 187th Infantry (3rd Brigade) was attached to 3rd Infantry Division and was the main effort in clearing Saddam International Airport. The division then served as part of the occupation forces of Iraq, using the city of Mosul as their primary base of operations. 1st and 2d Battalion, 327th Infantry Regiment (1st Brigade) oversaw the remote airfield Qayarrah West 30 miles (48 km) south of Mosul. The 502d Infantry Regiment (2d Brigade) and 3d Battalion, 327th Infantry Regiment were responsible for Mosul itself while the 187th Infantry Regiment (3d Brigade) controlled Tal Afar just west of Mosul. The 101st Airborne also participated in the Battle of Karbala. The city had been bypassed during the advance on Baghdad, leaving American units to clear it in two days of street fighting against Iraqi irregular forces. The 101st Airborne was supported by the 2nd Battalion, 70th Armor Regiment with Charlie Company, 1st Battalion, 41st Infantry Regiment, 1st Armored Division. The 3d Battalion, 502d Infantry Regiment, 101st Airborne Division was awarded a Valorous Unit Award for their combat performance.

On the afternoon of 22 July 2003, troops of the 101st Airborne 3/327th Infantry HQ and C-Company, aided by U.S. Special Forces killed Qusay Hussein, his 14-year-old son Mustapha, and his older brother Uday, during a raid on a home in the northern Iraqi city of Mosul. As few as 40 101st Soldiers and 8 Task Force 121 operators were on the scene. After Task Force 121 members were wounded, the 3/327th Infantry surrounded and fired on the house with a TOW missile, Mark 19 Automatic Grenade Launcher, M2 50 Caliber Machine guns and small arms. After about four hours of battle (the whole operation lasted 6 hours), the soldiers entered the house and found four dead, including the two brothers and their bodyguard. There were reports that Qusay's 14-year-old son Mustapha was the fourth body found. Brig. Gen. Frank Helmick, the assistant commander of 101st Airborne, commented that all occupants of the house died during the fierce gun battle before U.S. troops entered.

Once replaced by the first operational Stryker Brigade, the 101st was withdrawn in early 2004 for rest and refit. As part of the Army's modular transformation, the existing infantry brigades, artillery brigade, and aviation brigades were transformed. The Army also activated the 4th Brigade Combat Team, which includes the 1st and 2nd Battalions, 506th Infantry Regiment and subordinate units. Both battalions were part of the 101st in Vietnam but saw their colors inactivated during an Army-wide reflagging of combat battalions in the 1980s.

As of December 2007, 143 members of the division have died while on service in Iraq.

=== Second deployment to Iraq ===
The division's second deployment to Iraq began in the late summer of 2005. The division headquarters replaced the 42d Infantry Division, which had been directing security operations as the headquarters for Task Force Liberty. Renamed Task Force Band of Brothers, the 101st assumed responsibility on 1 November 2005 for four provinces in north central Iraq: Salah ad Din, As Sulymaniyah. On 30 December 2005, Task Force Band of Brothers also assumed responsibility for training Iraqi security forces and conducting security operations in Ninevah and Dahuk provinces as the headquarters for Task Force Freedom was disestablished.

During the second deployment, 2d and 4th Brigades of the 101st Airborne Division were assigned to conduct security operations under the command of Task Force Baghdad, led initially by 3d Infantry Division, which was replaced by 4th Infantry Division. The 1st Battalion of the 506th Infantry (4th Brigade) was separated from the division and served with the Marines in Ramadi, in the Al Anbar province. 3d Brigade was assigned to Salah ad Din and Bayji sectors and 1st Brigade was assigned to the overall Kirkuk province which included Hawijah.

Task Force Band of Brothers' primary mission during its second deployment to Iraq was the training of Iraqi security forces. When the 101st returned to Iraq, there were no Iraqi units capable of assuming the lead for operations against Iraqi and foreign terrorists. As the division concluded its tour, 33 battalions were in the lead for security in assigned areas, and two of four Iraq divisions in northern Iraq were commanding and controlling subordinate units.

Simultaneously with training Iraqi soldiers and their leaders, 101st soldiers conducted numerous security operations against terrorist cells operating in the division's assigned, six-province area of operations. Operation Swarmer was the largest air assault operation conducted in Iraq since 22 April 2003. 1st Brigade conducted Operation Scorpion with Iraqi units near Kirkuk.

Developing other aspects of Iraqi society also figured in 101st operations in Iraq. Division commander Major General Thomas Turner hosted the first governors' conference for the six provinces in the division's area of operations, as well as the neighboring province of Erbil. Numerous civil affairs operations were directed by the division, including the construction and renovation of schools, clinics, police stations, and other important landmarks in civilian communities from Turkey to Baghdad and from the Syrian border to the Iranian border.

=== Return to Afghanistan ===
While the 1st, 2nd and 3rd Brigade Combat Teams were deployed to Iraq 2007–2008, the division headquarters, 4th Brigade Combat Team, the 101st Sustainment Brigade, and the 101st Combat Aviation Brigade followed by the 159th Combat Aviation Brigade were deployed to Afghanistan for one-year tours falling within the 2007–09 window.

=== 2010 Afghanistan ===
The Division Headquarters, 101st Combat Aviation Brigade, 1st Brigade Combat Team, 2d Brigade Combat Team, 3rd Brigade Combat Team, and 4th Brigade Combat Team, and the 101st Sustainment Brigade deployed to Afghanistan in 2010. This is the first time since returning from Iraq in 2006 where all four infantry brigades (plus one CAB, SUSBDE) have served in the same combat theater.

On 15 September 2010, the 101st Airborne began a major operation known as Operation Dragon Strike. The aim of the operation was to reclaim the strategic southern province of Kandahar, which was the birthplace of the Taliban movement. The area where the operation took place has been dubbed "The Heart of Darkness" by Coalition troops.

By the end of December 2010, the operation's main objectives had been accomplished. The majority of Taliban forces in Kandahar had withdrawn from the province, and much of their leadership was said to have been fractured.

As of 5 June 2011, 131 soldiers had been killed during this deployment, the highest death toll to the 101st Airborne in any single deployment since the Vietnam War.

=== 2011 Afghanistan ===
The 2nd Battalion, 327th Infantry Regiment, 101st Airborne Division conducted a major combat operation in Barawala Kalay Valley, Kunar Province, Afghanistan in late March–April 2011. It is known as the Battle of Barawala Kalay Valley. It was an operation to close down the Taliban supply route through the Barawala Kalay Valley and to remove the forces of Taliban warlord Qari Ziaur Rahman from the Barwala Kalay Valley. The 2nd Battalion, 327th Infantry Regiment, 101st Airborne Division would suffer 6 killed and 7 wounded during combat operations. It would inflict over 100 casualties on the Taliban and successfully close down the Taliban supply route. ABC News correspondent Mike Boettcher was on scene and he called it the fiercest fighting he has ever seen in his 30 years of being in war zones.

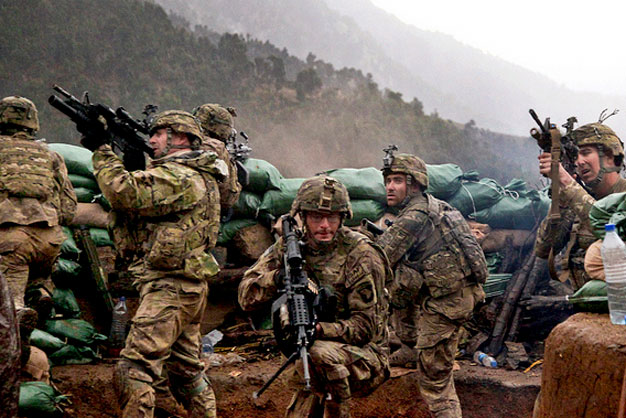
U.S. Army soldiers with 2nd Battalion, 327th Infantry Regiment, 101st Airborne Division return fire during a firefight with Taliban forces in Barawala Kalay Valley in Kunar province, Afghanistan, 31 March 2011.

Since the beginning of Operation Enduring Freedom 166 101st Airborne soldiers have died while serving in Iraq.

=== Operation United Assistance ===
In 2014, the 101st Airborne Division Headquarters deployed to west Africa to help contain the spread of Ebola, as part of Operation United Assistance.

=== 5th Special Forces Group ===
In 2015, 5th Special Forces Group held five training sessions with the 1st Brigade Combat Team, 101st Airborne Division. The classes covered communications and the operation of all-terrain vehicles. There was also a training session on the operation of TOW missiles. Prior to these sessions training between U.S. Special Forces and U.S. conventional forces had been uncommon.

=== 2016 Iraq ===
The U.S. Army sent 500 soldiers from the 101st Airborne Division (Air Assault) to Iraq and Kuwait in early 2016 to advise and assist Iraqi Security Forces.

In the recent conflicts the 101st Airborne has been increasingly involved conducting special operations especially the training and development of other states' military and security forces and counter-terrorism operations. This is known in the special operations community as foreign internal defense and counter-terrorism. It was announced 14 January 2016 that soldiers of the 101st Airborne would be assigned rotations in Iraq, to train members of the Iraqi ground forces in preparation for action against the Islamic State. Defense Secretary Ash Carter told the 101st Airborne that "The Iraqi and Peshmerga forces you will train, advise and assist have proven their determination, their resiliency, and increasingly, their capability. But they need you to continue building on that success, preparing them for the fight today and the long hard fight for their future. They need your skill. They need your experience."

In Spring 2016, 200 soldiers from 1st Battalion, 320th Field Artillery Regiment replaced a unit of the 26th MEU at Firebase Bell; they used M777 155 mm howitzers to provide support to Iraqi forces attacking IS-occupied villages between Makhmour and Mosul. 500 soldiers from the division's headquarters, including its commander Major General Gary J. Volesky, and about 1,300 soldiers from 2nd Brigade Combat Team also deployed to Iraq in the Spring.

On 26 June 2016, it was announced that Iraq had successfully taken back full control of Fallujah from the Islamic State of Iraq (ISIS). Iraqi ground troops have been under the direction of the 101st Airborne since early 2016. In summer 2016, Stars and Stripes reported that about 400 soldiers from 2nd Brigade Combat Team will deploy to Iraq as part of the 11 July 2016 announcement by Defense Secretary Ash Carter of the presidential approved deployment of an additional 560 U.S. troops to Iraq to help establish and run a logistics hub at Qayyarah Airfield West, about 40 miles south Mosul, to support Iraqi and coalition troops in the Battle of Mosul.

On 26 August 2016, an article from the website War is Boring shows a photo of a 101st Airborne Division M777 howitzer crew conducting fire missions during an operation to support Iraqi forces at Kara Soar Base in Iraq on 7 August 2016. The article also confirms that American artillery has been supporting Iraqi forces during its campaign against ISIS.

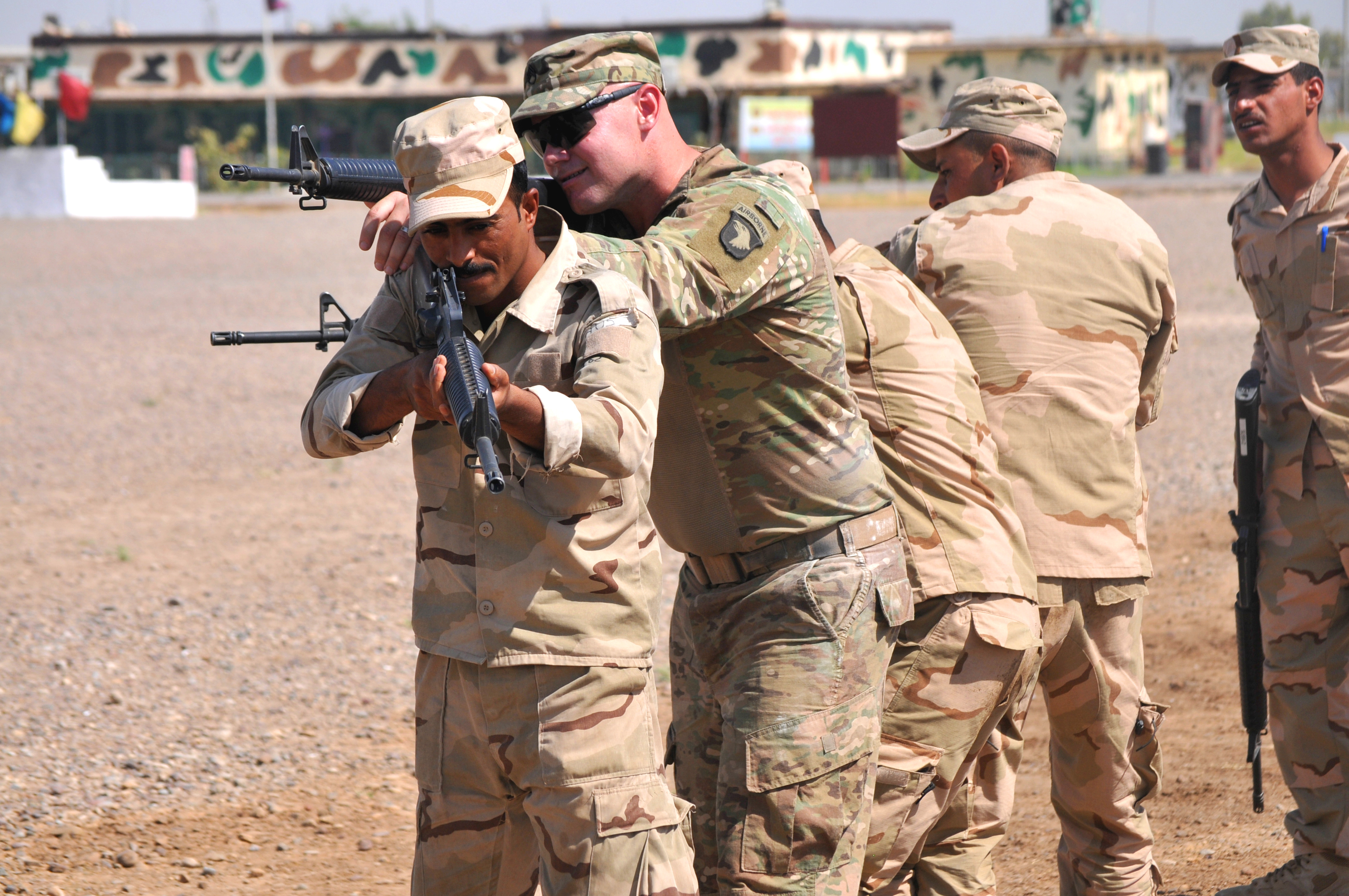
A trainer with Company A, 1st Battalion 502nd Infantry Regiment, Task Force Strike, 101st Airborne Division assists Iraqi army ranger students during a room clearing drill at Camp Taji, Iraq 18 July 2016.

On 31 August 2016, Clarksville Online reported U.S. soldiers from the 1st Battalion, 502nd Infantry Regiment, Task Force Strike, 101st Airborne Division (Air Assault), took charge of a Ranger training program for qualified volunteers from Iraqi security forces at Camp Taji, Iraq. The Ranger training program, led by Company A, 1-502nd, is designed to lay the foundation for an elite Iraqi unit.

On 21 September 2016, an article from The Leaf Chronicle reported that Battery C, 1st Battalion, 320th Field Artillery Regiment, 2nd Brigade Combat Team, 101st Airborne Division had been successfully conducting artillery raids against the Islamic State in Iraq and the Levant. Battery C is said to have executed hundreds of missions and fired thousands of rounds in support of ISF operations since arriving in theatre in late May.

On 17 October 2016, an article from The Leaf Chronicle stated that the 101st Airborne was leading a coalition of 19 nations to support the liberation of Mosul from ISIL. Under the direction of the 101st Iraqi forces have taken back a significant amount of geography from the control of ISIS. This included the liberation of Hit, Fallujah, and Qayyarah.

On 3 November 2016, it was reported that U.S. Army combat engineers were seen just west of the Great Zab River about halfway between the Kurdish city of Irbil and Mosul. They were searching for improvised bombs. They were wearing 101st Airborne Division patches. The soldiers said they were not allowed to talk to the media.

On 17 November 2016, sources reported that the 101st Airborne Division was headed home after a nine-month deployment to Iraq. Over the course of nine months, soldiers from the 101st Airborne helped train the Iraqi government's security forces. They taught marksmanship, basic battlefield medical care and ways to detect and disarm improvised explosive devices. The division helped authorize 6,900 strikes, meant to destroy ISIS hideouts and staging areas. The 101st Airborne played a significant role in the liberation of several Iraqi cities during this deployment.

=== Operation Freedom's Sentinel ===
On 6 September 2016, The U.S. Army announced it will deploy about 1,400 soldiers from 3rd Brigade Combat Team to Afghanistan in fall 2016, in support of Operation Freedom's Sentinel – the U.S. counter-terrorism operation against the remnants of al-Qaeda, ISIS–K and other terror groups. Senior leadership referred to the 3rd Brigade Combat Team as being exceptional. Brig. Gen. Scott Brower stated that the Rakkasans are trained, well-led, and prepared to accomplish any mission given to them.

=== War in Somalia ===
In mid-April 2017, it was reported that 40 soldiers from the 101st Airborne Division were deployed to Somalia on 2 April 2017 to improve the capabilities of the Somali Army in combating Islamist militants. AFRICOM stated that the troops will focus on bolstering the Somali army's logistics capabilities; an AFRICOM spokesman said that "This mission is not associated with teaching counterextremism tactics" and that the Somali government requested the training.

== Honors ==
=== Campaign participation credit ===
- World War I (2nd and 3rd Brigades only):
1. Hundred Days Offensive (also known as the Battle of Saint-Quentin or the Second Battle of the Somme);
2. Meuse-Argonne Offensive;
3. Picardy 1918
- World War II (except 159th Aviation Brigade):
1. Normandy (with arrowhead);
2. Rhineland (with arrowhead);
3. Ardennes-Alsace;
4. Central Europe
- Vietnam War (Except 159th Aviation Brigade):
1. Defense (1st Brigade only);
2. Counteroffensive (1st Brigade only);
3. Counteroffensive, Phase II (1st Brigade only)
4. Counteroffensive, Phase III;
5. Tet Counteroffensive;
6. Counteroffensive, Phase IV;
7. Counteroffensive, Phase V;
8. Counteroffensive, Phase VI;
9. Tet 1969/Counteroffensive;
10. Summer-Fall 1969;
11. Winter-Spring 1970;
12. Sanctuary Counteroffensive;
13. Counteroffensive, Phase VII;
14. Consolidation I;
15. Consolidation II
- Southwest Asia (Except 159th Aviation Brigade):
1. Defense of Saudi Arabia;
2. Liberation and Defense of Kuwait
- Haiti
- Afghanistan
- Iraq

=== Decorations ===
- Presidential Unit Citation (Army) for NORMANDY (Division and 1st Brigade only)
- Presidential Unit Citation (Army) for BASTOGNE (Division and 1st Brigade only)
- Presidential Unit Citation (Army) for DAK TO, VIETNAM 1966 (1st Brigade only)
- Presidential Unit Citation (Army) for DONG AP BIA MOUNTAIN (3rd Brigade only)
- Presidential Unit Citation (Army) for AFGHANISTAN 2010–2011 (2nd Brigade only)
- Valorous Unit Award for THUA THIEN PROVINCE (3rd Brigade and DIVARTY only)
- Valorous Unit Award for TUY HOA (1st Brigade only)
- Valorous Unit Award for AN NAJAF (1st Brigade only)
- Valorous Unit Award for AFGHANISTAN 2010 (3rd Brigade only)
- Valorous Unit Award for AFGHANISTAN 2010–2011 (2nd Brigade only)
- Meritorious Unit Commendation (Army) for VIETNAM 1965–1966 (1st Brigade only)
- Meritorious Unit Commendation (Army) for VIETNAM 1968 (3rd Brigade only)
- Meritorious Unit Commendation (Army) for SOUTHWEST ASIA (Except 159th Aviation Brigade)
- Meritorious Unit Commendation (Army) for IRAQ 2003–2004 (1st Brigade only)
- Meritorious Unit Commendation (Army) for IRAQ 2005–2006 (4th Brigade only)
- French Croix de guerre with Palm, World War II for NORMANDY (Division and 1st Brigade only)
- Belgian Croix de guerre 1940 with Palm for BASTOGNE (Division and 1st Brigade only);
- Cited in the Order of the Day of the Belgian Army for action at BASTOGNE (Division and 1st Brigade only)
- Belgian Fourragère 1944 (Division and 1st Brigade Only)
- Cited in the Order of the Day of the Belgian Army for action in FRANCE AND BELGIUM (Division and 1st Brigade only)
- Republic of Vietnam Cross of Gallantry with Palm for VIETNAM 1966–1967 (1st Brigade only)
- Republic of Vietnam Cross of Gallantry with Palm for VIETNAM 1968 (2d Brigade only)
- Republic of Vietnam Cross of Gallantry with Palm for VIETNAM 1968–1969 (Except 159th Aviation Brigade)
- Republic of Vietnam Cross of Gallantry with Palm for VIETNAM 1971 (Except 159th Aviation Brigade)
- Republic of Vietnam Civil Action Honor Medal, First Class for VIETNAM 1968–1970 (Except 159th Aviation Brigade)
- Republic of Vietnam Civil Action Honor Medal, First Class for VIETNAM 1970 (DIVARTY only)
- Navy/Marine Unit Commendation (Army) for Iraq 2005–2006 (4th Brigade only)
- Joint Meritorious Unit Commendation for Afghanistan 2008–2009 (5–101 AVN only) Joint Meritorious Unit Award for Haiti Operation Uphold Democracy (101st MP CO only)

== Notable members ==
- Ed Austin – Florida politician and lawyer
- Joseph Beyrle – The only American soldier to have served with both the United States Army and the Soviet Army in World War II
- John R. Block – Secretary of Agriculture under Ronald Reagan.
- Donald Burgett – Author of four books on his experiences as a paratrooper during World War II
- Richard Chaves – American actor born in 1951.
- Blake Clark – American actor
- Robert G. Cole – World War II Medal of Honor recipient
- Tom Cotton – Arkansas politician, current junior U.S. Senator from Arkansas
- Randy Couture – MMA fighter and coach
- Fred Dailey – Ohio politician
- Sam Gibbons – Florida Politician
- David Hackworth – Writer
- James R. Hendrix – World War II Medal of Honor recipient
- Jimi Hendrix – Musician
- Mike Lebowitz – Attorney, pioneer in field of military expression, military law, served in Iraq with Pathfinder Company of 101st Airborne Division.
- William C. Lee – General, World War II veteran, considered as one of the most important influences behind the establishment of U.S. airborne troops
- Joe E. Mann – World War II Medal of Honor recipient
- Tommy Mercer – Professional wrestler, currently signed to TNA Wrestling under the name Crimson
- Jorge Otero-Barreto – received 3 Silver Stars and 5 Purple Hearts in Vietnam
- Eric Rudolph – Terrorist responsible for the Centennial Olympic Park bombing and others
- Leslie H. Sabo, Jr. – Vietnam War Medal of Honor recipient
- Joseph F. Sackett – radiologist and professor of neuroradiology, Company Commander, 326 Med Battalion
- Louis Simpson – Poet who won the 1964 Pulitzer Prize for poetry with his collected works At the End of the Open Road
- Robert Sink – commanded the 506th Parachute Infantry Regiment of the 101st Airborne Division. Played by Dale Dye in the mini-series Band of Brothers.
- Jack Warden – actor who served with the 501st Infantry; in That Kind of Woman Warden played a paratrooper from the 82nd Airborne Division.
- Ernie Wheelwright – American football player, actor & singer
- Dan White – San Francisco supervisor who assassinated San Francisco Mayor George Moscone and Supervisor Harvey Milk, on Monday, 27 November 1978.
- Jesse White – Illinois politician.
- Barry Winchell – Pfc, whose murder by a fellow soldier at Fort Campbell became a point of reference in the debate about the "Don't ask, don't tell" policy.
- Richard Winters – Major, World War II veteran, portrayed by Damian Lewis in the TV series Band of Brothers

== See also ==
- List of commanders of 101st Airborne Division

== Notes ==
=== Citations ===
Preceded by 1st Infantry Division	Regional Command East; 2013–Current	Succeeded by 10th Mountain Division
Preceded by 82nd Airborne Division	Regional Command East; 2010–2011	Succeeded by 1st Cavalry Division
