= Jo Metson Scott =

British portrait and documentary photographer

Jo Metson Scott is a British portrait and documentary photographer, based in London. Her book, The Grey Line, is about British and American soldiers who dissented to the Iraq War.

== Life and work ==
Metson Scott was born in Exeter. She has also lived in West Bridgford, Rushcliffe, Nottinghamshire. She earned a BA in Photography from Birmingham Institute of Art and Design (a faculty of Birmingham City University) in 2002. After University she moved to London and assisted various photographers. She works commercially for magazines and newspapers as well as making personal work.

Commissioned by Nottingham Castle Museum and Art Gallery in 2009, Metson Scott made portraits of "local people with fascinating stories" for an exhibition at the gallery titled Tales from the City.

Over the course of two years she photographed a member of Great Britain's gymnastic squad, preparing for the 2012 Summer Olympics in London (at which time he was 12 years old). This work was exhibited at B Store in London in 2012.

Her book The Grey Line, published 10 years after the 2003 invasion of Iraq, is "a reflection on the war told from the perspective of Britain and American soldiers who have spoken out against the invasion" and "also a reflection of the fallout of such a stance." The book, five years in the making, contains images of veterans and "their story presented through their own handwritten testimonies."

== Publications ==
=== Publications by Metson Scott ===
- The Grey Line. Stockport: Dewi Lewis, 2013. ISBN 978-1-907893-32-2. Edition of 650 copies.

=== Publications with contributions by Metson Scott ===
- Invisible Britain. Bristol: Policy, 2018. Edited by Paul Sng. ISBN 978-1447344117. With a foreword by Michael Sheen.

== Solo exhibitions ==
- Tales from the City, Nottingham Castle Museum and Art Gallery, Nottingham, 2010
- Gym Boy, B Store, London, 2012

== Awards ==
- 2012: Firecracker Photographic Grant for The Grey Line

== See also ==
- Dissent by military officers and enlisted personnel
- Opposition to the Iraq War
- Samuel Provance – included in The Grey Line
