= Military expression =

Free speech rights of United States military service members

Military expression is an area of military law pertaining to the United States military that relates to the free speech rights of its service members. While "military free speech" was the term used during the Vietnam War era, "military expression" has become a niche area of military law since 2001. Besides media references relating to specific cases, the term was used at military whistleblower committee hearings with members of the United States House of Representatives and Senate on May 14, 2008. Transcripts of the hearings show that attorney Mike Lebowitz was identified as testifying as a legal expert in "military expression". That hearing also included references by U.S. Representative Sheila Jackson Lee (D-TX) who also referred to the area of law as "military expression".

== Limitations on military expression ==
While the civilian population of the United States is afforded the right to free expression under the First Amendment, the U.S. Supreme Court has affirmed the notion that service members have a reduced level of free speech. While the Court acknowledged that service members do have First Amendment rights, these rights are limited:

The armed forces depend on a command structure that at times must commit men to combat, not only hazarding their lives but ultimately involving the security of the Nation itself. Speech that is protected in the civil population may nonetheless undermine the effectiveness of response to command. If it does, it is constitutionally unprotected.

== After September 11, 2001 ==
With the advent of the Iraq War in 2003, the issue of military expression was again in the public eye as a relatively small number of service members and veterans began demonstrating. One case revolved around a former Marine (still under contract with the IRR) who was photographed by the Washington Post wearing a partial uniform during an anti-war demonstration in Washington, D.C. The individual faced disciplinary action for his participation in this demonstration, as well as for a politically charged email he sent to a Marine officer. However, in this case, the service member avoided the other than honorable discharge being sought by the military due to the First Amendment arguments posed on his behalf. That case, which was argued by attorney Mike Lebowitz in representation of anti-war and political activist Adam Kokesh, is regarded as the first military expression case of its kind to result generally favorably for the service member.

== Effects of technology ==
Political speech, to include being active in a political party, also has become an issue as the Internet and email permits easier participation despite rules against such activity.

== See also ==
- First Amendment to the United States Constitution
- Dissent by military officers and enlisted personnel
- Iraq Veterans Against the War
- Kiel, John L. Jr., When Soldiers Speak Out: A Survey of Provisions Limiting Freedom of Speech in the Military" Parameters, U.S. Army War College Quarterly, Autumn 2007. [https://web.archive.org/web/20130522221753/http://strategicstudiesinstitute.army.mil/pubs/parameters/Articles/07autumn/kiel.pdf
