= Mike Lebowitz =

American attorney and military-law expert

- Born: Michael J. Lebowitz; August 21, 1977 (age 49); Cleveland, Ohio
- Education: Kent State University; Case Western Reserve University School of Law
- Occupation: Attorney
- Military career
- Branch: U.S. Army 101st Airborne Division
- Service years: 2005-2006

Michael J. Lebowitz (born August 21, 1977) is a Washington, D.C., attorney and expert in the field of military law, national security, cyber, and Military Expression. He has published a number of legal articles on First Amendment issues pertaining to the military as well as the field of national security and war crimes. In 2009, he became a prosecutor in the Military Commission for the terrorism and war crimes suspects detained in Guantanamo Bay, Cuba. He frequently appears in the media as a legal expert on national security and cyber issues.

== Background ==
Born in Cleveland, Ohio, Lebowitz has a journalism degree from Kent State University (1999) and a Juris Doctor degree from Case Western Reserve University School of Law (2003). In 2005–2006, he served in Iraq as a Pathfinder with the 101st Airborne Division, where he helped capture foreign fighters. After returning from Iraq, he began advocating on behalf of military families and veterans. Lebowitz continues to serve as a military lawyer in the Judge Advocate General's Corps of the Army Reserve.

== Military law ==
Lebowitz is an attorney in the field of military law, national security, and cyber law, and gained notoriety on military free speech issues where he served as defense counsel in a number of cases where uniformed personnel faced discipline for speech-related activities. Lebowitz has worked on trials involving military freedom and expression. He lectures on the subject and is asked to serve as a media resource on the impact technology continues to play in the field of military free speech. More recently, he has written on the subject of war crimes and national security, and has served as a war crimes prosecutor at Guantanamo Bay. He was a longtime Guantanamo Bay prosecutor assigned to the capital case against Khalid Sheikh Mohammad and others accused of plotting the 9/11 attacks. He later became chief legal advisor to Army Cyber Command.
