= Dissent by military officers and enlisted personnel =

Officers and enlisted personnel, in the U.S. Armed Forces and elsewhere, regularly take an oral oath to support and defend the primary convening document (i.e. constitution, articles of confederation, ruling laws and statutes) and/or the supreme leader of the nation-state. There have been countless cases throughout human history where commissioned military officers and enlisted personnel—as individuals or small groups—have chosen to question and disobey the orders of their superior officers or the supreme leader of the state.

== Forms of dissent ==
Dissent by military officers falls into two main categories: violent and non-violent. In essence, when a military officer, military leader chooses to oppose the orders given to him by his superior officers or national leader, he/she must decide whether his counter-action will be violent or non-violent in nature and in aim.

Violent or forcible dissent or opposition among military officers against their superiors or national authority is further broken down into the following categories:

- Assassination
- Coup d'état
- Sabotage

Non-violent actions which are designed to dissent from the command authority come in the following formats:

- Refusal to execute orders
- Refusal to deploy or mobilize
- Conscientious objection
- Disinformation
- Espionage
- Defection
- Leaking of information to the press
- Jumping the chain-of-command (appealing to a higher military authority)
- Modifying or changing original orders

== Dissent versus conscientious objection ==
Conscientious objection commonly refers to those who are being drafted into military service, who are not currently in military service. However, there are cases in history where an officer or enlisted member of the military has volunteered for military service (or is drafted) and they find later on that they do not agree with their government's war policies or orders.

== Dissent in the case of war crimes ==
There are countless examples in recent history where military officers have refused to execute the orders of their superiors because they felt their military was party to war crimes.

Several German generals during World War II either refused orders, modified orders, or mounted coups or assassination attempts against the German leader Adolf Hitler. Many of these generals were highly respected by the German people and within the German High Command, notably Erwin Rommel, Claus von Stauffenberg, and Otto von Stülpnagel.

With respect to recent history, United States and UK involvement in the War in Iraq has produced notable dissenters who, in their words, feel that war crimes have been perpetrated by American and British forces in Iraq. Ehren Watada and Malcolm Kendall-Smith—an American officer and British officer, respectively—have been court martialed for refusing to deploy with their units. Both Watada and Kendall-Smith dissent on the grounds that their respective governments are party to war crimes in Iraq.

== Notable military dissenters ==
=== Germany ===
- Wilhelm Canaris – Kriegsmarine admiral who was head of the German Military Intelligence Service (Abwehr) during World War II; his dissension included serving as a double agent for the British, rescuing Jews by providing them with fake documents and spiriting them to safety, and participating in the July 20 Plot
- Erwin Rommel – German Army field marshal who opposed Adolf Hitler
- Claus von Stauffenberg –[German Army colonel and leader of the July 20 Plot to depose Adolf Hitler
- Carl-Heinrich von Stülpnagel – German Army general in France and member of the July 20 Plot; directed to take control of Paris and negotiate an armistice with the Allies
- Otto von Stülpnagel – German Army general who refused Hitler's order to burn Paris in August 1944; he opposed Hitler's Final Solution

=== United Kingdom ===
- Malcolm Kendall-Smith – Royal Air Force flight lieutenant and physician who served twice with the British Army in Iraq; refused a third deployment on the grounds that War in Iraq was not legal and US actions in Iraq resembled those of the Nazi regime in Germany

=== United States ===
- Peter Brown – US Army captain and graduate of West Point who filed paperwork to be discharged as a conscientious objector upon return from his first deployment to Iraq
- Yance T. Gray – US Army staff sergeant who co-authored an op-ed in The New York Times questioning the US presence in Iraq
- Paul Hackett – US Marine Corps Reserve major; publicly opposed some Bush administration's policies in Iraq during a 2005 Congressional election while still supporting President George W. Bush
- Buddhika Jayamaha – US Army specialist who co-authored an op-ed in The New York Times questioning the US presence in Iraq
- John Kerry – Spokesperson for Vietnam Veterans Against the War (VVAW); lieutenant junior grade in the US Navy Reserve
- Omar Mora – US Army sergeant who co-authored an op-ed in The New York Times questioning the US presence in Iraq
- Jeremy A. Murphy – US Army staff sergeant who co-authored an op-ed in The New York Times questioning the US presence in Iraq
- Jeremy Roebuck – US Army sergeant who co-authored an op-ed in The New York Times questioning the US presence in Iraq
- Edward Sandmeier – US Army sergeant who co-authored an op-ed in The New York Times questioning the US presence in Iraq
- Wesley D. Smith – US Army sergeant who co-authored an op-ed in The New York Times questioning the US presence in Iraq
- Jon Soltz – US Army Reserve captain; president of VoteVets.org (a veterans organization against the US presence in Iraq)
- Ehren Watada – US Army first lieutenant who objected to the US presence in Iraq, refused deployment

== See also ==
- Military expression
- Dissent
