= Joseph F. Sackett =

American clinical neuroradiologist and professor of radiology

- Born: January 16, 1940 (age 86); Cleveland, Ohio
- Occupation: Neuroradiologist
- Spouse: Sheilah

Joseph Frederick Sackett is an American clinical neuroradiologist and professor of radiology. During his academic career he published 74 papers in refereed journals, served as a visiting professor for 32 semesters and wrote 11 chapters in radiology textbooks. The University of Wisconsin–Madison established an endowed chair, the Joseph F. Sackett Professorship in Radiology, in honor of him.

== Education ==
Sackett received a B.A. in biology from Dartmouth College in 1962 and an M.D. from Tulane University School of Medicine in 1966.

== Faculty appointments ==
- Joseph Sackett Professorship (endowed Chair) University of Wisconsin, 1999
- Emeritus Professor, University of Wisconsin, July 1, 1997
- Professor and Chairman of Radiology, University of Wisconsin Clinical Science Center, Madison, Wisconsin, 1981 - 1996
- Associate Professor of Radiology, University of Wisconsin Center for Health Sciences, Madison, Wisconsin, 1978 - 1981
- Assistant Professor of Radiology, University of Wisconsin Center for Health Sciences, Madison, Wisconsin, 1974 - 1978

== Career ==
On May 20, 1981, Sackett joined colleagues Thomas F. Meaney of Cleveland Clinic and M. Paul Capp, of the University of Arizona College of Medicine on a panel organized by the American College of Radiology. The panel discussed breakthrough techniques in the area of digital vascular imaging and was widely reported in the media.

In 1987, Sackett was elected vice president of the American Society of Neuroradiology.

In May, 2016, Tulane University School of Medicine presented Sackett with a Lifetime Achievement Award in recognition of his contributions to the field of radiology.
