= History 101 (TV series) =

2020 documentary television series

- Genre: History
- Country of origin: United Kingdom
- Original language: English
- No. of seasons: 2
- No. of episodes: 20

Production
- Running time: 20–23 minutes
- Production company: ITN Productions

Original release
- Release: 22 May 2020 – 25 August 2022

History 101 is a documentary television series that premiered on Netflix on 22 May 2020. The premise revolves around history mini-lessons consisting of archive footage, facts and graphs about various topics. Netflix released a second season of the series on 25 August 2022.

== Episodes ==
Series overview
Series	Episodes	Originally released
1	10	22 May 2020
2	10	25 August 2022

=== Season 1 (2020) ===
No. overall	No. in season	Title	Original release date
1	1	"Fast Food"	22 May 2020
Cheap, quick and tasty, fast food became a culinary craze in the 1950s. But has our quest for convenience created an irreversible health crisis?
2	2	"The Space Race"	22 May 2020
Fifteen international agencies spend $62 billion every year on space travel. What's fueling our costly — and dangerous — drive to explore the universe?
3	3	"The Rise of China"	22 May 2020
In the 21st century, China has become a global economic powerhouse. Why was the rest of the world so slow to notice its rise to the top?
4	4	"Plastics"	22 May 2020
Plastics have transformed how we live, but progress comes at a high price: 7.8 billion tons of waste. Are plastics a miracle or a catastrophe?
5	5	"Oil and the Middle East"	22 May 2020
Oil has brought great wealth to the Middle East and ignited major wars. Is it a blessing or a curse for the region, as well as the rest of the world?
6	6	"Robots"	22 May 2020
We share the planet with an estimated 9 million robots, from self-driving cars to surgical arms. Could they one day completely replace humans?
7	7	"Feminism"	22 May 2020
Feminism has ushered in sweeping changes to society, securing rights for women around the world. How much further do we have to go?
8	8	"Nuclear Power"	22 May 2020
Over 10% of the world's electricity comes from nuclear power. But with radioactive waste and the threat of nuclear meltdown, are we playing with fire?
9	9	"AIDS"	22 May 2020
Nearly 40 million people are living with HIV. After decades of research and activism, how far have we come in finding a cure and battling the stigma?
10	10	"Genetics"	22 May 2020
DNA analysis has given us the tools to map disease, solve crimes and more. But in our rush to decode DNA, are we leaping before we look?

=== Season 2 (2022) ===
No. overall	No. in season	Title	Original release date
11	1	"GPS"	25 August 2022
Once a secret military program, GPS now guides our daily lives, from providing directions to finding friends. But what do we trade for this convenience?
12	2	"MP3s"	25 August 2022
MP3s transformed how we listen to music — and spawned digital piracy. Streaming helped the industry recover, but how can artists get their fair share?
13	3	"Credit Cards"	25 August 2022
Credit cards changed the global economy and attitudes about personal spending, but record levels of consumer debt raise the question: Just who's in charge?
14	4	"Psychedelics"	25 August 2022
Growing evidence suggests that psychedelic drugs could treat brain injuries and psychological problems. But can we get past their controversial history?
15	5	"Bottled Water"	25 August 2022
Bottled water is a big business, selling itself as a tastier and healthier alternative to the tap variety. Is there truth behind the claims?
16	6	"Dating Apps"	25 August 2022
Thanks to dating apps, finding love is easier than ever. But are we now so focused on playing the game that we're missing out on real connection?
17	7	"Lasers"	25 August 2022
They're used for everything from entertainment to medicine — and now for weapons straight out of science fiction. Have lasers become too hot to handle?
18	8	"Home Workouts"	25 August 2022
The home fitness revolution has exploded into a multibillion-dollar industry. Are home workouts a healthy habit... or just hype?
19	9	"IVF"	25 August 2022
A groundbreaking medical reproductive procedure has made parenthood possible for millions around the world... but at what cost?
20	10	"High Fructose Corn Syrup"	25 August 2022
Sweet deal or bitter pill? High fructose corn syrup rose up to dominate supermarket shelves, but what is it doing to our health?

== Release ==
History 101 was released on 22 May 2020, on Netflix.

In June 2020, Netflix removed the ninth episode, which covered the HIV and AIDS epidemic, after outrage from members of the Haitian-American community. In August 2020, the episode was restored.
