= List of recipients of the Croix de Guerre =

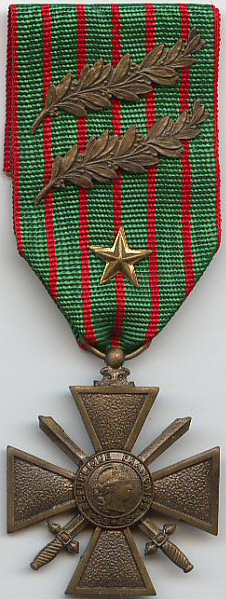
1914–1918 Croix de guerre with three citations, 2 bronze palms, 1 silver gilt star

The Croix de Guerre (French: [kʁwa də ɡɛʁ], Cross of War) is a military decoration of France. It was first created in 1915 and consists of a square-cross medal on two crossed swords, hanging from a ribbon with various degree pins. The decoration was awarded during World War I, then revived for World War II, and from 1921 had another version for other conflicts. The Croix de Guerre was also commonly bestowed on foreign military forces allied to France.

The Croix de Guerre may be awarded either as an individual award or as a unit award to those soldiers who distinguish themselves by acts of heroism involving combat with the enemy. The medal is awarded to those who have been "mentioned in dispatches", meaning a heroic deed or deeds were performed meriting a citation from an individual's headquarters unit. The unit award of the Croix de Guerre with palm was issued to military units whose members performed heroic deeds in combat and were subsequently recognized by headquarters. The Croix de guerre des théâtres d'opérations extérieures ("Cross of War for external theatres of operations") was established in 1921 for other conflicts around the world.

Often whole units were awarded the decoration, and the total number of recipients during WWI was 2,065,000. Especially in WW2, the decoration was also awarded to whole villages, such as those involved in the French Resistance. The following is a very incomplete list of recipients of the Croix de Guerre, concentrating on awards to Americans.

== Recipients of the Croix de Guerre (France) for Meritocracy during World War I ==
U.S. soldiers awarded Croix de Guerre (France) Medal for Gallantry in Action during World War I. Photo taken in 1919.

- Millicent Sylvia Armstrong was awarded the Croix de Guerre for bravery in rescuing wounded soldiers while under fire.
- William George Barker, VC, DSO & Bar, MC & Two Bars, a Canadian First World War fighter ace and Victoria Cross recipient.
- Lt.-Gen. Sir James Melville Babington, Commander of the 23rd Division (United Kingdom)
- Hobey Baker, an American fighter pilot.
- Lt. Fred Becker, the University of Iowa's first All-American left school to enlist prior to his senior season. Commissioned in the Army and assigned to a Marine platoon. KIA at Soissons, July 1918. Awarded the Distinguished Service Cross, Silver Star, and France awarded him the Croix de Guerre.
- Arthur Bluethenthal, All American football player and decorated World War I pilot.
- Romeo Bosetti, Italian-French silent film director.
- Solon Hannibal de la Mothe Borglum, for work with the Les Foyers du Soldat. American Sculptor.
- Byrne, John G Sgt Irish Guard Service No 1730 British and French troops advanced across the Yser - Ypres canal 31/7/1917.
- Wilson H. Williams With the 227th Aero Squadron. He was wounded while in action in the Toul sector by a shell which carried away portion of his jaw bone. He was a winner of the Michelin Marksmanship honors, and ranked sergeant first class in areo service. Williams was the first man to reach Quintin Roosevelt when the latter illustrious son of the famous Theodore Roosevelt met his death in action on the front line in France.
- Bl. Daniel Brottier, beatus in the Roman Catholic Church; acted as a military chaplain during the war.
- Stanley Melbourne Bruce, 1st Viscount Melbourne and later Prime Minister of Australia, in 1917.
- Eugene Bullard, wounded in the 1916 battles around Verdun, was awarded the Croix de Guerre for his heroism. Served with the Lafayette Escadrille as the first African-American combat aviator.
- Georges Carpentier, Aviator during the war as well as a World Light-Heavyweight Champion boxer. Best known for his bout with Jack Dempsey in 1921.
- Vernon Castle, Pilot in the Royal Flying Corps. Flying over the Western Front, he completed 300 combat missions and shot down two aircraft.
- Harry Cator, then a Sergeant in the 7th Battalion of The East Surrey Regiment of the British Army, awarded the Victoria Cross and the Croix de Guerre avec Palme for his heroism.
- Colonel Lawrence Moore Cosgrave DSO & Bar (August 28, 1890 – July 28, 1971) was the Canadian signatory to the Japanese Instrument of Surrender at the end of World War II.
- Father John B. DeValles, A chaplain with the Yankee Division, he was known as the "Angel of the Trenches" for his valiant deeds in caring for both Allied and German soldiers on the battlefields of France. Fr. DeValles was injured in a mustard gas attack while attending to a fallen soldier and died two years later.
- William J. Donovan, legendary soldier and founder of the Office of Strategic Services. Awarded U.S. Medal of Honor, Distinguished Service Cross and Croix de Guerre with Palm and Silver Star.
- Otis B. Duncan, lieutenant-colonel in the 370th Infantry Regiment (United States) and highest-ranking African-American officer to serve in World War I combat.
- Ernest Fawcus, officer in the Northumberland Fusiliers and Royal Flying Corps, awarded the Croix de Guerre for leading successful bombing attacks.
- Lady Dorothie Feilding, a British volunteer nurse awarded the Croix de Guerre for bravery in the field.
- George L. Fox, awarded the Croix de Guerre for his service on the Western Front. He was also one of the Four Chaplains who gave their lives when the troopships USAT Dorchester was hit by a torpedo and sank on February 3, 1943, during World War II.
- Robert Gauthiot, French Orientalist, linguist, and explorer, interrupted his exploration of the Pamir Mountains in July 1914 to return home to serve as a captain in the infantry. He received the Croix de Guerre before he was mortally wounded at the Second Battle of Artois in May 1916.
- Bob Hoffman, an American who later became known for bodybuilding and weightlifting
- Major Edwin L. Holton was awarded the Croix de Guerre for distinguished service as deputy commissioner of the American Red Cross in France in charge of re-education and rehabilitation of the disabled soldiers. He had a staff of 60 Red Cross Officials assisted by 15,000 workers. The staff he supervised helped 136,000 disabled soldiers of the 200,000 American wounded in WWI.
- William F Howe, Commanding Officer of 102nd Field Artillery Regiment on the Western Front
- Lieutenant-Colonel Harold Iremonger
- Sgt. Henry Johnson served with the 369th Infantry Regiment, better known as the Harlem Hellfighters or the Black Rattlers, the regiment consisted entirely of African Americans excepting their commanding officers. He was awarded the Croix de Guerre with special citation and a golden palm for bravery in fighting off a German raiding party. Also posthumously awarded the Purple Heart(1996), the Distinguished Service Cross (2002), and the U.S. Army Medal of Honor (2015) for his actions in the battle.
- Major General Charles E. Kilbourne who was also the first American to win the United States' three highest medals for bravery.
- Joyce Kilmer (1886–1918), American poet, sergeant and intelligence observer with the 69th Volunteer Infantry, 42nd Rainbow Division, was posthumously awarded the Croix de Guerre for service.
- Lieut. Ronald Langton-Jones, D.S.O., R.N.
- Henry Louis Larsen, an American Marine commanding the 3rd Battalion 5th Marines during every major battle of the war in France involving the United States.
- E. Brooke Lee American Major from Maryland.
- Henri de Lubac, a Roman Catholic Jesuit novice serving in the Third Infantry Regiment, who was severely wounded in the head on 1 November 1917 while fighting near Verdun. He later became an influential Catholic theologian and Cardinal.
- Douglas MacArthur, American colonel and later brigadier general of the 42nd Rainbow Division, who served as chief of staff of the division then later as the commander of the 84th Infantry Brigade. He was awarded his first of three total World War I Croix de Guerre on 18 March 1918 for participating in a French trench raid on 26 February 1918. MacArthur was the first ever American awarded the French Croix de Guerre. He was awarded two more Croix de Guerre for combat service in summer 1918 while the 42nd Division was under the command of French general Henri Gouraud. He was awarded the Croix de Guerre with two palms and one star for World War I service. MacArthur was one of only three American generals who were wounded or killed in World War I. The other two were Edward Sigerfoos (killed in action) and Albertus W. Catlin (wounded in action). He later became a General of the Army and a Medal of Honor recipient during World War II.
- William March, American writer, awarded the Croix de Guerre with palm.
- George C. Marshall, General of the Army and Secretary of State, awarded the Croix de Guerre with palm.
- Lawrence Dominic McCarthy, was also an Australian recipient of the Victoria Cross, the highest and most prestigious award for gallantry in the face of the enemy that can be awarded to British and Commonwealth forces.
- Horace McCoy, American novelist and screenwriter.
- John McNulty (U.S. Marine Corps)
- Gustave A. Michalka, with two of his men he captured a machine gun by assault and killed the crew. By his bravery and prompt action he avoided losses in his platoon.
- David McIlvenny, from Belfast was an ambulance driver with the British Army Service Corp. Serving in Italy, he was first awarded the Military Medal for rescuing wounded under shell-fire. He subsequently received gunshots wounds to the face. He was awarded the Croix De Guerre in August 1918 for attending to severely wounded French troops in Italy.
- Charles E. Morris, M.M; Private, Manchester Regiment, Army No. 302578, was awarded Croix de Guerre on 30 October, 1918 for conspicuous bravery in the field at Passchaendale during October 1917.
- Ruth Morton, field nurse from Washington University in St. Louis. Drove ambulance onto the battle field rescuing countless wounded soldiers.
- Joseph Oklahombi, American soldier of the Choctaw nation who was a Choctaw code talker
- George S. Patton, legendary American general.
- Waldo Peirce, American Red Cross volunteer (1918, for courage during the Vosges Hills Battle)
- Isabel Weld Perkins, for Red Cross volunteer work.
- Thomas A. Pope 1918 Corporal, U.S. Army; also earned the U.S. Army Medal of Honor, the British Distinguished Conduct Medal, and the Médaille militaire, for bravery displayed in Hamel, France.
- Eddie Rickenbacker, Captain and flying ace of the 94th Aero Squadron, United States Army Air Service, during World War I; also recipient of the U.S. Medal of Honor.
- James E. Rieger, Major (later Colonel), led a key attack during the Meuse-Argonne offensive. Also awarded the Distinguished Service Cross
- Marcel Riffard, aeronautics engineer and member of the 38th Artillery Regiment, received Croix de Guerre with star.
- Needham Roberts served with the 369th Infantry Division, better known as the Harlem Hellfighters or the Black Rattlers, a regiment consisted entirely of African Americans excepting their commanding officers.
- Theodore Roosevelt Jr., Son of President Theodore Roosevelt. Battalion commander in France.
- Milunka Savić, Serbian female officer was awarded the French Croix de Guerre 1914–1918 with Palm. She is the only woman in the world awarded with this medal for service in World War I.
- James M. Sellers, president of Wentworth Military Academy and College and U.S. Marine. Awarded the Croix de Guerre for heroism at Belleau Wood
- 1st Lt Francis Shea US ARMY air corps France 1919 for bravery in combat while protecting troops in the field who were under fire dropped bombs by hand to repeal the German onslaught.
- Battling Siki, He won the world World Light-Heavyweight Championship from fellow Croix de Guerre recipient Georges Carpentier in 1922.
- John R. Slay, Sergeant Company G 254th Infantry 69th Division Barricourt France, Gallantry in action 2 November 1918 Order NO. 16.684 D 23 April 1919
- Laurence Stallings, American writer.
- Francis V. Streeter Jr. - Cited for Bravery and Given Crosse de Guerre. Private Francis V. Streeter Jr. serving with the Ambulance corps of the American Army after having had previous experience with the Ambulance corps of the French Army, has been awarded the croix de guerre.
- Donald Swartout, American Jackson, Michigan, intelligence pfc, Comp I, 128th Infantry, 32d Div. French Croix de Guerre with bronze palm, " dated March 15, 1919, General Headquarters, French Armies of the East Marshal Petain for carrying important messages between Juvigny and Terny Sorny while wounded.
- John Tovey, Royal Navy, later became a senior naval commander and an Admiral of the Fleet.
- Stephen W. Thompson, aviator, was awarded the Croix de Guerre with palm. He is credited with the first aerial victory by the U.S. military.
- Ludovicus Van Iersel, Dutch-American sergeant who won the Croix de Guerre twice while serving in France.
- James Waddell was one of New Zealand’s most highly decorated soldiers of the First World War. Waddell was received in the French Legion of Honour and promoted twice. He was also awarded the French Croix de Guerre seven times during the war.
- Herbert Ward, artist, sculptor and African explorer, awarded the Croix de Guerre while serving with the British Ambulance Committee in the Vosges
- Edwin "Pa" Watson, served in France. Earning the U.S. Army Silver Star and the Croix de Guerre from the French government.
- William A. Wellman, American fighter pilot in the Lafayette Flying Corps, awarded Croix de Guerre with two palm leaves, 1918
- Samuel Woodfill, American infantry lieutenant who disabled several German machine-gun nests and killed many enemy combatants with rifle, pistol and pickaxe. He was awarded the American Medal of Honor and the French Croix de Guerre.
- Alvin C. York was awarded the Croix de Guerre with Bronze Palm for his Valor in the Battle of Meuse River-Argonne Forest, near the town of Verdun, France. Also awarded the American Medal of Honor.
- Marie Marvingt – According to her Legion of Honor citation, she was awarded the Croix De Guerre for piloting a 1915 bombing raid on the German-held airfield of Frescaty in Metz. Additionally, with the connivance of a friendly lieutenant, during WW1 she disguised herself as a man and joined the 42nd Battalion of Infantry (42nd Battalion des Chasseurs de Pied). Highly competent, she fit into the 42nd Battalion for about 6 weeks, until she was discovered and sent home. She then joined the Italian 3rd Regiment of Alpine Troops in the Dolomites.

== Recipients of the Croix de Guerre (France) for Meritocracy during World War II ==
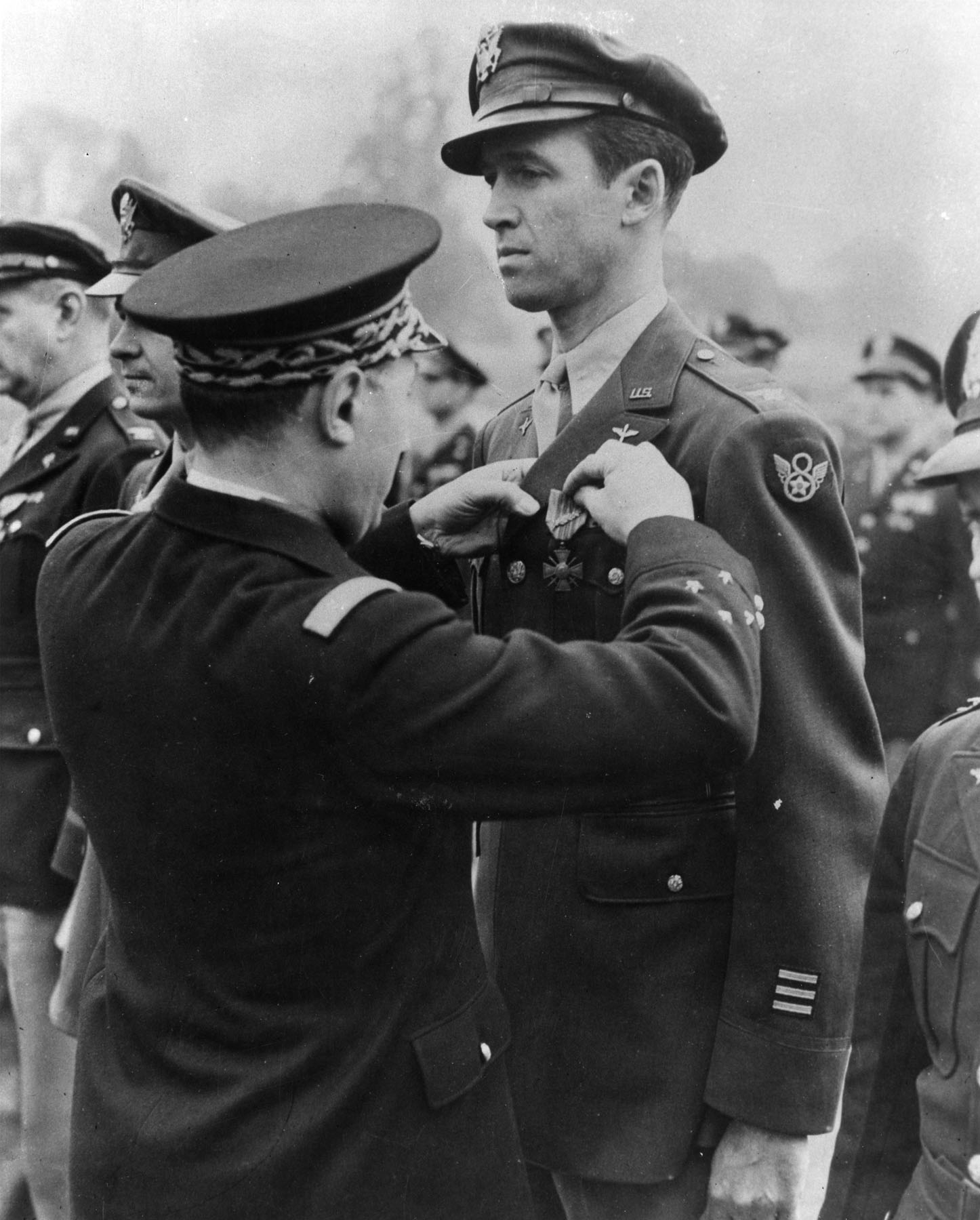
Colonel Jimmy Stewart being awarded the Croix de Guerre with Palm in 1944.

- Jehan Alain, French organist and composer. Engaged with enemy, single-handedly killing 16 with carbine before being killed himself.
- Władysław Anders, Polish general, commander of the 2nd Polish Corps, 1943–46.
- Vera Atkins, assistant to head and intelligence officer of the French section of Special Operations Executive (SOE).
- John Beech Austin, Squadron Leader in both the RAF and the SOE.
- Maurice Bambier, French politician and former Mayor of Montataire, awarded the French Croix de Guerre for his services during the Dunkirk evacuation.
- Josephine Baker, American-born French dancer, singer and actress, for her work in the French Resistance.
- Donald Porter Barnes, US Air Corps, Lt. Col. and CO of 947th Engineer Aviation Camouflage Battalion, awarded Croix de Guerre with Gold Star on 11 May 1945 by Gen. James B Newman (Am) and Col. Mayer (Fr), per Decision #581, French Provisional Government
- Samuel Beckett, awarded the Croix de Guerre by General Charles de Gaulle in March 1945.
- Marcel Bigeard, highly decorated French general and veteran of World War II, French Indochina and Algeria; received both the Croix de guerre 1939–1945 and the Croix de guerre TOE with a total of 25 citations, including 17 palms.
- Mary E. Blanshard (Hall), Courier, Sabatour.
- Gardner Botsford, later an editor and journalist, for his service in Operation Overlord and after.
- Phil H. Bucklew, US naval officer; "Father of American Naval Special Warfare".
- Frederick Walker Castle, U.S. Army Air Forces general and posthumous recipient of the Medal of Honor
- Jacques Cousteau, aqualung inventor, diver and underwater film maker.
- Ève Curie, Author, war correspondent, lieutenant in the 1st Armored Division, "First Lady of UNICEF"
- Lionel Guy D'Artois, Canadian Army officer and SOE agent; awarded the Croix de Guerre for service with the Interior French Forces in occupied France.
- Collette Nirouet, AKA Evelyne Meunier, War nickname Joan of Arc, She was 18 years old in WW2 who disguised herself as male joining the 6th Company Of The Auverge Regiment of the French 1st Army on Oct 15, 1944. Joining the Company first as a nurse she then insisted and won to fight with the soldiers for the Company over several weeks and thereafter she participated fully in the company's activities both offensively & defensively as any male soldier. She earned the nickname Joan of Arc as she fought with the men in soldier's clothing for her patriotism and courage. She also went by the alternative name of Evelyne Meunier she is buried under this name she was fatally wounded on November 12, 1944, in the battle of Oberwald. Despite her missing remains, she was awarded the Croix de Guerre on August 30, 1985. She was also awarded the French Commemorative War Medal Liberation, These medals were given to her only because of the hard work from her former soldier in arms Antonin Cubizolles as her body was taken by the Germans when they fled the battle she was not recorded amongst the dead. Antonin started the process of having her recognized. Following a lengthy difficult process, he pieced together her life and military service the Company provided the testimonies that would later be used to gain her the awards she was due and also write her biography.
- Andree Peel – Awarded the Croix De Guerre for her WW2 service.
- Maria Justeau – Awarded the Croix De Guerre for her WW2 service.
- Philippe Daudy, journalist and novelist.
- Guy de Rothschild, awarded the Croix de Guerre for his military valor.
- Philippe de Rothschild, awarded the Croix de Guerre for his service with the Free French Forces.
- Gabriel Brunet de Sairigné, French colonel who participated with the Free French Forces to the East African Campaign (in Eritrea and Syria), the Tunisia Campaign, the Allied invasion of Sicily, the Operation Dragoon and the campaign of Alsace.
- Avery Dulles, S.J., awarded the Croix de Guerre for his liaison work with the French Navy.
- Dwight D. Eisenhower, Supreme Allied Commander during the liberation of France.
- Frantz Fanon, awarded the French Croix de Guerre by Raoul Salan for service in the French Free Forces in North Africa and Alsace.
- Carl Gustav Fleischer, Norwegian general, who won the first major victory against the German Axis forces.
- Stephen Galatti, Director of AFS, American Field Service
- Laure Gatet, French biochemist and a spy for the French Resistance.
- Francis Grevemberg, United States lieutenant colonel, later superintendent of Louisiana's state police.
- William Grover-Williams, Grand Prix driver and network organiser in the French section of the SOE
- Thomas "Loel" Guinness, Group Captain and pilot
- Tony Halik Polish pilot in RAF; after being the only Polish/RAF pilot shot down over France, he joined the French resistance.
- William Murray Hamilton, Scottish-American US Army officer, awarded for actions taken during the liberation of France.
- Samuel M Hogan, US Army Lieutenant Colonel commanding Task Force Hogan of the 3rd Armored Division. Led his reinforced tank battalion through some of the toughest battles in the European Theater including Mortain and the Falaise Pocket. The unit was mentioned in French dispatches at the division level, garnering its commander the Croix de Guerre with star.
- Gray, Joseph Butterfield of Durham Light Infantry (DLI), for heroism in the field. Even though seriously injured himself, he repeated went back to the front line to carry out injured colleagues.
- Bob Hoover, Army Air Corps pilot and USAF test pilot
- John Howard, awarded the Croix de Guerre in 1944 for his valor. When his ship struck a mine off the French coast, killing the captain, Howard took over command and fought valiantly to save his ship and crew, even jumping into the sea to rescue wounded sailors.
- Petrus Hendrik Hugo, Royal Air Force, South African ace. Citation: After having brilliantly participated in the campaign over France conducted in the autumn of 1941, in the course of many offensive missions against enemy navigation, his squadron to which were attached the French pilots. In 1942, personally led at the head of the Group ‘Isle de France’ 19 offensive missions of which 5 were carried out in the single day of 19th Aug. 1942, during the course of the combined operations over Dieppe.” No. 1778/1961/C Received with Bronze Palme.
- Agnès Humbert, art historian, was awarded the Croix de Guerre with silver gilt palm, for heroism in her work in the French Resistance.
- Charles F. Irving, 2LT. 2nd Armored Division, U.S. Army, was awarded the Croix de Guerre in 1944 for heroism in action for the liberation of France.
- Whitfield Jack, colonel under General Matthew Ridgway in Ruhr Valley campaign; major general later in United States Army Reserve
- Phillip Jackson, member of the French Resistance
- Sumner Jackson, American medical doctor and member of the French Resistance
- Toquette Jackson, Swiss, member of the French Resistance
- Maria Justeau, French Resistance heroine.
- Noor Inayat Khan, a wireless operator in the French section of the SOE. She was flown to occupied France in June 1944 and operated until mid. October. Captured and tortured, she was eventually executed at Dachau concentration camp on 13 September 1944; awarded the George Cross posthumously.
- Jan Kubiš, Czechoslovak paratrooper and assassin of Reichsprotektor of Bohemia and Moravia, SS-Obergruppenführer Reinhard Heydrich, in 1942 as part of Operation Anthropoid.
- James Harry Lacey 'Ginger'. R.A.F. Battle of Britain Ace – Awarded May 1940, but not presented until 1983.
- Curtis E. LeMay, awarded the French Croix de Guerre with palm.
- Major Desmond Longe, SOE agent and commander of Mission Eucalyptus. Awarded the French Croix de Guerre with palm.
- Mohammad Reza Pahlavi, Shah of Iran
- Douglas MacArthur, General of the Army and Medal of Honor recipient, awarded the Croix de Guerre with palm.
- André Malraux French novelist, art theorist and Minister for Cultural Affairs.
- George C. Marshall, General of the Army and Secretary of State, awarded the Croix de Guerre with palm.
- Jean Mayer, future president of Tufts University, awarded for his courage and bravery.
- Blair "Paddy" Mayne; Lt. Colonel, British Special Air Service, Croix de Guerre with Palm. Awarded Légion d'honneur, awarded the Distinguished Service Order (UK) four times.
- Ruari McLean CBE (Royal Naval Volunteer Reserve), awarded in 1942, served in the Free French Submarine Rubis
- William A. McNulty, a WWII U.S. Army field commander
- General Dragoljub Mihailovic, Serbian officer and Allies resistance leader of Royal Yugoslav Army in Fatherland, awarded by Charles de Gaulle.
- Paul de Montgolfier, fighter pilot for the French Air Force.
- Audie Murphy, American actor; most decorated U.S. Army soldier during the war, was awarded the French "Croix de Guerre avec Palme" three times and the Belgian Croix de Guerre with Palm once, as well as the American Medal of Honor.
- Leonard W. Murray, Canadian admiral, awarded the Croix de Guerre with bronze palm for his role in the Battle of the Atlantic.
- Eileen Nearne, member of the UK's SOE. She served in occupied France as a radio operator under the codename "Rose".
- David James Nielson, British Major with the 12th Battalion Royal Fusiliers. Awarded the Croix de Guerre with silver gilt star for his role in helping the Maquis and organising the defence of 4 bridges near Troyes after parachuting into France on 26 August 1944, as the commander of team CECIL during Operation Jedburgh.
- John B. Oakes, future editor of the New York Times; awarded for his counter-espionage activities with the Office of Strategic Services (OSS).
- Russell Roach, American corporal of A Company, 3rd US Infantry Regiment (The Old Guard), awarded the Croix de guerre 1939–1945 (France) in 1944 for his bravery and valor during the Liberation of France during his campaign in Rhineland, Germany.
- Marcel Oopa, Polynesian politician.
- Peter J. Ortiz, Marine officer; member, Office of Strategic Services (OSS).
- George S. Patton, legendary U.S. Army general. Awarded for leading U.S. Third Army during the liberation of France.
- Andree Peel (1905–2010), French Resistance member.
- Col. David E. Pergrin, awarded the Croix de Guerre for service during the Battle of the Bulge.
- Harry Peulevé, a wireless operator and organiser in the French Section of the SOE.
- Prince Philip, awarded the Croix de Guerre in 1948 for service in the Royal Navy.
- Abbé Pierre (1912–2007), French Roman Catholic cleric; founder of Emmaus.
- Forrest Pogue, US Army combat historian.
- Roland Fremont Pryce, US Navy Captain.
- Rainier III, Prince of Monaco, decorated with the Croix de Guerre for service with the Free French army.
- Robert Rosenthal of the Eighth Air Force of the USAF.
- Colonel Jimmy Stewart being awarded the Croix de Guerre with Palm in 1944.
- Alexander Sachal, Russian artist who joined the French Resistance; awarded the Croix de Guerre.
- George Scales, British farmer/Commanding Officer LCT-7011 awarded the Croix de Guerre during D-Day. Presented to him in 2007 by French Attache Naval, Capitaine de Vaisseau Jean Nicolas Gauthier of the Ministere de la Defense.
- Desmond J. Scott, a New Zealand fighter pilot and Group Captain who flew for the RAF. He was awarded both the Belgian and the French Croix de Guerre.
- Jan Smuts, South African Prime Minister.
- George Reginald Starr, Special Operations Executive.
- James Stewart, American actor awarded the Croix de Guerre with Palm in 1944
- Violette Szabo, a British SOE agent who was sent into occupied France. Her first mission was a success, but during her second mission she was captured and tortured. Eventually sent to Ravensbruck concentration camp, she was executed on 5 February 1945 (at age 23); awarded the George Cross posthumously.
- Alfred Touny (1886–1944), a leader of the French Resistance, now buried in the Mémorial de la France combattante.
- Nancy Wake of the SOE was the highest decorated Allied servicewoman of the war. Awarded the Croix de Guerre three times for service with the French maquis.
- F.F.E. Yeo-Thomas, member of RF Section of the SOE. A Special Operations Executive Liaison officer, he worked with the Bureau Central de Renseignements et d'Action (BCRA) of the Free French forces organizing and coordinating resistance in both Vichy and Occupied France.
- Frederick St. Clair Wilkinson, (Canadian Major), Royal Hamilton Light Infantry in charge of rear battalion headquarters during Dieppe Operation on August 19. 1942.
- Major Richard D. Winters, fought with Easy Company, 506th Parachute Infantry Regiment, 101st Airborne Division from the Normandy invasion to Operation Market Garden to the Battle of the Bulge. He was besieged at Bastogne and aided with taking of Hitler's Eagle's Nest in Austria.
- Jack M. Greener, Medic, K Company, 103rd Infantry Division, Purple Heart, Bronze Star, Silver Star with Silver Oakleaf Cluster, French Croix De Guerre
- Major Edward Cecil Scott, A Battery Commander, 5 Canadian Anti-Tank Regiment, for actions taken during the Battle of the Falaise Pocket
- Capt. William B. York, 4th Infantry Division, US Army, was awarded Croix De Guerre on 29 August 1944 by Gen. Charles De Gaulle, for bravery in combat securing the entry into Paris of the Free French Forces after initial progress was stalled by heavy German resistance August 19-24 1944.
- Capt. James H. Fields - 10th Armor Infantry, 4th Armored Division, Medal of Honor, Silver Star, Bronze star, Purple heart. Decorated in the field by General George S. Patton

== Recipients of the Croix de Guerre (France) not otherwise categorized ==
During World War I, Cher Ami, a Carrier pigeon with the 77th Division, helped save the lives of 194 American soldiers by carrying a message across enemy lines in the heat of battle. Cher Ami was shot in the chest and leg, losing most of the leg to which the message was attached, and blinded in one eye, but continued the 25-mile flight avoiding shrapnel and poison gas to get the message home. Cher Ami was awarded the French Croix de Guerre with Palm for heroic service. He later died from the wounds received in battle and was enshrined in the Smithsonian Institution.

Aram Karamanoukian, a lieutenant-general of the Syrian army of Armenian descent, who participated in the First Arab-Israeli war, was awarded the Croix de Guerre.
