= Croix de Guerre =

Military decoration of France

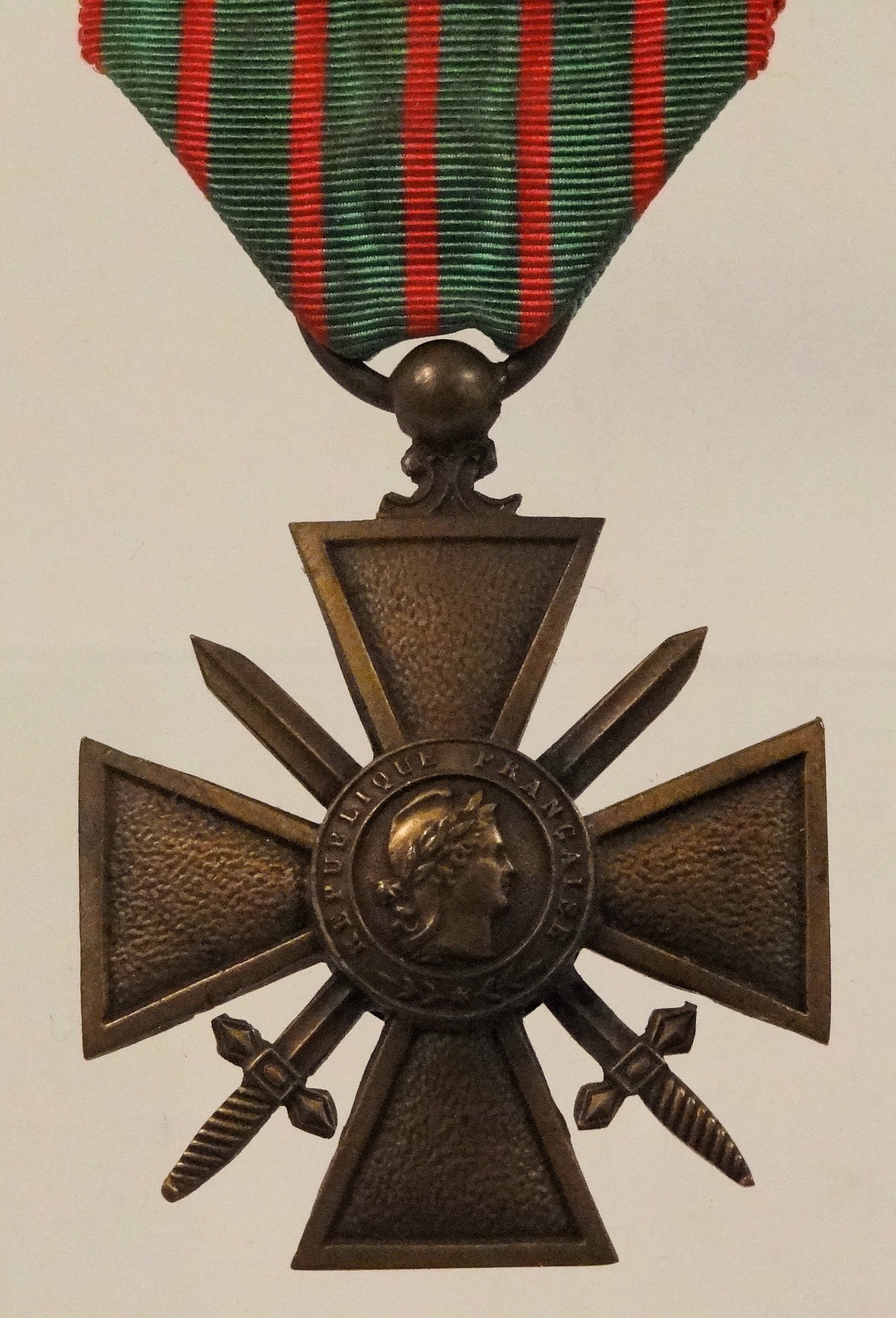
- Type: Military decoration (four class decoration); Four degrees: Croix de Guerre with Bronze Palm; Croix de Guerre with Gold Star; Croix de Guerre; Croix de Guerre with Bronze Star
- Awarded for: Individuals who distinguish themselves by acts of heroism involving combat with enemy forces
- Description: A bronze cross with swords
- Presented by: France
- Eligibility: Military personnel only, often bestowed to members of allied countries
- Campaign: Other wars not fought on French soil
- Clasps: None for wars or campaigns; stars and palm denote level of each medal awarded
- Status: Active
- Established: April 2, 1915
- Croix de Guerre avec Palme ribbon bars and streamer; (1914–1918 & 1939–1945)

The Croix de Guerre (French: [kʁwa də ɡɛʁ], Cross of War) is a military decoration of France. It was first created in 1915 and consists of a square-cross medal on two crossed swords, hanging from a ribbon with various degree pins. The decoration was first awarded during World War I, again in World War II, and in other conflicts; the croix de guerre des théâtres d'opérations extérieures ("cross of war for external theatres of operations") was established in 1921 for these. The Croix de Guerre was also commonly bestowed on foreign military forces allied to France.

The Croix de Guerre may be awarded either as an individual award or as a unit award to those soldiers who distinguish themselves by acts of heroism involving combat with the enemy. The medal is awarded to those who have been "mentioned in dispatches", meaning a heroic deed or deeds were performed meriting a citation from an individual's headquarters unit. The unit award of the Croix de Guerre with palm was issued to military units whose members performed heroic deeds in combat and were subsequently recognized by headquarters.

== Appearance ==
The Croix de Guerre medal varies depending on which country is bestowing the award and for what conflict. Separate French medals exist for the First and Second World War.

For the unit decoration of the Croix de Guerre, a fourragère (which takes the form of a braided cord) is awarded; this is suspended from the shoulder of an individual's uniform.

As the Croix de Guerre is issued as several medals, and as a unit decoration, situations typically arose where an individual was awarded the decoration several times, for different actions, and from different sources. Regulations also permitted the wearing of multiple Croix de Guerre, meaning that such medals were differentiated in service records by specifying French Croix de Guerre, French Croix de Guerre (WWI), etc.

== French Croix de Guerre ==
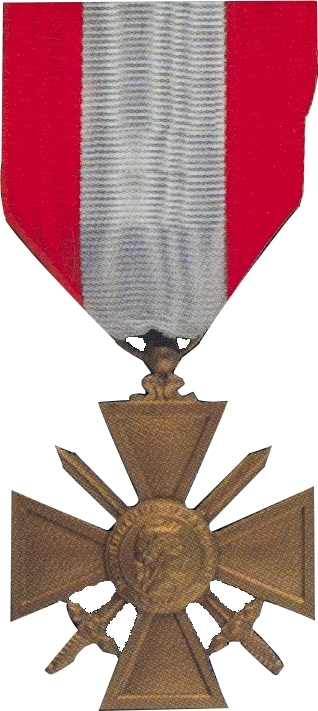
French Croix de guerre des TOE

There are three distinct Croix de Guerre medals in the French system of honours:

Ribbon	Awards
	Croix de guerre 1914–1918 (for World War I service)
	Croix de Guerre 1939–1945 (for World War II service)
	Croix de guerre des théâtres d'opérations extérieures (TOE), for wars other than World War I and World War II not fought on French soil (Note: At the time of the Algerian War, Algeria was considered part of France and war actions labelled "law enforcement operations", so soldiers were awarded the Croix de la Valeur Militaire instead of the Croix de guerre des TOE.)

Furthermore, the French collaborationist government created two croix during World War II. These croix are now illegal under French law and wearing them is outlawed:

Ribbon	Awards
	Croix de Guerre (Vichy France; for World War II service)
	Croix de Guerre de la Légion des Volontaires Français (for World War II service)

The Croix was created by a law of April 2, 1915, proposed by French deputy Émile Briant. The Croix reinstated and modified an older system of mentions in dispatches, which were only administrative honours with no medal accompanying them. The sculptor Paul-André Bartholomé created the medal, a bronze cross with swords, showing the effigy of the republic.

The French Croix represents a mention in dispatches awarded by a commanding officer, at least a regimental commander. Depending on the officer who issued the mention, the ribbon of the Croix is marked with extra pins.

- Mentioned in Dispatches:
  - a bronze star for those who had been mentioned at the regiment or brigade level.
  - a silver star, for those who had been mentioned at the division level.
  - a silver-gilt (gold) star for those who had been mentioned at the corps level.
  - a bronze palm for those who had been mentioned at the army level.
  - a silver palm stands for five bronze ones.
  - a silver-gilt (gold) palm for those who had been mentioned at the Free French Forces level (World War II only).

The French Croix de guerre des TOE was created in 1921 for wars fought in theatres of operation outside France. It was awarded during the Indochina War, Korean War, and various wars in the decades that followed. It is the only version of the Croix de Guerre still considered active, though it has not been presented since the Kosovo War in 1999.

When World War II broke out in 1939, a new Croix de Guerre was created by Édouard Daladier. It was abolished by Vichy Government in 1941, which created a new Croix de Guerre. In 1943 General Giraud in Algiers created another Croix de Guerre. Both the Vichy and Giraud Croix were abolished by General de Gaulle in 1944, who reinstated the 1939 Croix.

The Croix de Guerre takes precedence between the Ordre national du Mérite and the Croix de la Valeur Militaire, the World War I Croix being senior to the World War II one, itself senior to the TOE Croix.

== Unit award ==
The coat of arms of Leuven, featuring a French Croix de Guerre presumably to commemorate acts of heroism during the sacking of the city by Germany in 1914

The Croix can be awarded to military units, as a manifestation of a collective Mention in Despatches. It is then displayed on the unit's flag. A unit, usually a regiment or a battalion, is always mentioned at the army level. The Croix is then a Croix de Guerre with palm. Other communities, such as cities or companies can be also awarded the Croix.

When a unit is mentioned twice, it is awarded the fourragère of the Croix de Guerre. This fourragère is worn by all men in the unit, but it can be worn on a personal basis: those permanently assigned to a unit, at the time of the mentions, were entitled to wear the fourragère for the remainder of service in the military.

Temporary personnel, or those who had joined a unit after the actions which had been mentioned, were authorized to wear the award while a member of the unit but would surrender the decoration upon transfer. This temporary wearing of the fourragère only applied to the French version of the Croix de Guerre.

The 2nd Battalion Devonshire Regiment of the British Army along with 5 Battery RA were awarded the French Croix de Guerre with palm for its gallant defence of Bois des Buttes on 27 May 1918, the first day of the Third Battle of the Aisne. The Croix de Guerre with palm was also awarded to 1/4th Battalion Kings Shropshire Light Infantry for Gallantry near Bligny, part of the Second Battle of the Marne. Several other British Army battalions would receive the award before the end of the war.

== United States acceptance ==
Regarding the United States in World War I, on April 10, 12, and 13, 1918, the lines being held by the troops of the 104th Infantry Regiment, of the 26th "Yankee" Division, in Bois Brûlé, near Apremont in the Ardennes, were heavily bombarded and attacked by the Germans. At first the Germans secured a foothold in some advanced trenches which were not strongly held but, thereafter, sturdy counterattacks by the 104th Infantry - at the point of the bayonet - succeeded in driving the enemy out with serious losses, entirely re-establishing the American line. For its gallantry the 104th Infantry was cited in a general order of the French 32nd Army Corps on April 26, 1918. In an impressive ceremony occurring in a field near Boucq on April 28, 1918, the 104th Infantry's regimental flag was decorated with the Croix de Guerre by French General Fenelon F.G. Passaga. "I am proud to decorate the flag of a regiment which has shown such fortitude and courage," he said. "I am proud to decorate the flag of a nation which has come to aid in the fight for liberty." Thus, the 104th Infantry became the very first American unit to be honored by a foreign country for exceptional bravery in combat. In addition, 117 members of the 104th Infantry received the award, including its commander, Colonel George H. Shelton.

In World War II, the 320th Bombardment Group received the Croix de Guerre avec Palme for action in preparation for and in support of Allied offensive operations in central Italy, April–June 1944. It was the first American unit in this war to be awarded the citation. Members of the 440th AAA AW Battalion (Anti-Aircraft Artillery - Automatic Weapons) of the U.S. Army also received the Croix de Guerre avec Palme (unit award) for stopping the German Ardennes counter-offensive in holding the town of Gouvy, Belgium for 4 1/2 days at the beginning of the Battle of the Bulge on December 16, 1944. Gouvy is midway between St. Vith and Bastogne. Commanding Officer of the 440th, Lt. Col. Robert O. Stone, and Pfc. Joseph P. Regis, also received an individual award of the Croix de Guerre avec Palme. On June 21, 1945, French General De Gaulle presented the following citation to the 34th United States Infantry Division: "A 'division d'elite', whose loyal and efficient cooperation with French divisions, begun in TUNISIA, was gloriously continued throughout the Italian campaign, in particular during the operations of BELVEDERE when the 34th Division, despite the difficulties of the moment, displayed most courageous efforts in support of the operations of the 3rd Algerian Division. This citation bears with it the award of Croix de Guerre with Palm." Soldiers of the US Army 509th Parachute Infantry Regiment "Geronimos" were awarded the Croix de Guerre with Silver Star, For Service in the Southern France campaign. The 369th Infantry Regiment, known as the Harlem Hellfighters by the Germans they killed, were as a unit awarded this medal. 171 members were personally awarded the medal along with the nations highest award, the Legion of Honor. The 509th Unit colors bear the Streamer embroidered "MUY EN PROVENCE".

On March 30, 1951, the President of the French Republic, Vincent Auriol, pinned not only the Croix de Guerre with Palm but also the Legion of Honour on the flag of the Brigade of Midshipmen of the United States Naval Academy in recognition of historic contributions of the Naval Academy, particularly the contributions of alumni to victory in World War II. The flag of the Brigade of Midshipmen does not display streamers for either award, nor do Midshipmen wear the fourragère, despite apparent entitlement to do both.

Today, members of several US Army and Marine Corps units that received the fourragère for combat service during World Wars I and/or II are authorized to wear the award while assigned to the unit. Upon transfer from the unit the individual is no longer authorized to wear the fourragère. Wearing of the decoration is considered ceremonial only and it is not entered as an official military individual or unit award in the service member's permanent service records. Units currently authorized to wear the French fourragère are:

- US Army
  - 2nd Infantry Division "Indianhead" – For service during WW I with the I Corps, US First Army, American Expeditionary Forces (AEF)
  - 3rd Infantry Division "Marne Division" – For service during WW I with the III Corps, US First Army, AEF & in WW II with VI Corps, US Seventh Army, Sixth US Army Group, AEF
  - 4th Cavalry Regiment "Raiders" – For service during WW II as the 4th Cavalry Group (Mechanized) VII Corps, US First Army, Twelfth US Army Group, AEF
  - 16th Infantry Regiment – For service during WW I in the 1st Infantry Division, I Corps, US First Army, AEF
  - 28th Infantry Regiment "Lions of Cantigny" – For service during WW I in the 2d Infantry Brigade, 1st Infantry Division, I Corps, US First Army, AEF (Regiment deactivated as of 9 April 2015)
  - 369th Infantry Regiment "Harlem Hellfighters" – For service during WW I in the French 16th and 161st Divisions (Regiment reorganized and re-designated as of 20 July 2007 as the 369th Sustainment Brigade, 53d Troop Command, New York Army National Guard)
  - 371st Infantry Regiment (United States) "Red Hand Division" / "Buffalo Soldiers" - was a segregated African American regiment, nominally a part of the 93rd Division, that served in World War I under French Army command. The 371st was awarded the French Croix de Guerre as a unit award. Following a review of Medal of Honor recommendations, one enlisted man, Freddie Stowers, received the Congressional Medal of Honor in 1991 for actions in the assault on Côte 188. During the war, one officer received the French Légion d'Honneur, 22 officers and men received the Distinguished Service Cross (United States), and 123 officers and men received the French Croix de Guerre.
- 102nd Cavalry Regiment - For service during WW II
- 106th Cavalry Regiment - For service during WW II - 121st CRS: Fourragère; 121st CRS: French Croix de Guerre with Palm; 106th Group: French Croix de Guerre with Palm
- US Marine Corps
  - 5th Marine Regiment "The Fighting Fifth"
  - 6th Marine Regiment "The Fighting Sixth"
  - 6th Machine Gun Battalion (Deactivated 13 August 1919)
    - Note: Only members of the above named USMC units, including attached Navy personnel, are authorized to wear the French Fourragère for their unit's service during WW I as the 4th Marine Brigade, of the US Army 2d Infantry Division, I Corps, US First Army, AEF:

== Notable recipients ==
=== Individuals in World War I ===
- Colin Harrington McLeod (World War I) Lance Corporal First Australian Light Horse Regiment, Awarded French Croix de Guerre with palm for gallantry at UMM ESH SHERT and as part of the First Battle of the Jordan. McLeod was attacked by a raiding enemy party on the night of 1 April 1918. He held his position although he was subjected to heavy rifle and machine gun fire, until the enemy was forced to withdraw into a wadi where he advanced single handed and bombed them. His actions were the means of scaring off the enemy and an intended bombing raid by the enemy on allied forces.
- Albert J Perron (World War I) 5724, private, Awarded French Croix de Guerre with palm, order no. 11.722 "D" dated November 19, 1918, General Headquarters, French Armies of the North and Northeast, with the following citation: "He displayed great courage during the night of October 4, 1918. With the aid of a comrade he carried the wounded from the first-aid station to the ambulance a distance of 500 meters under a violent bombardment."
- Anthony Funicella (World War I) 101462, private, company B, 5th Machine Gun Battalion, 2nd Division. French Croix de Guerre with bronze star, under Order No. 13.296 "D", dated February 7, 1919, General Headquarters, French armies of the East with the following citation: "On October 4, 1918 near Somme-Py, he carried messages under a violent bombardment with the greatest contempt for danger and a bravery which was worthy of all praise rendering valuable service to his battalion commander." Residence at enlistment 619 Wardell Ave, Clairton, Pa
- Sgt. Henry Johnson served with the 369th Infantry Regiment, better known as the Harlem Hellfighters or the Black Rattlers, the regiment consisted entirely of African Americans excepting their officers. For his actions in battle in May 1918, Henry Johnson was the first American alongside Needham Roberts to receive the Croix de Guerre. He was awarded the Croix de Guerre with special citation and a golden palm for bravery in fighting off a German raiding party. Also posthumously awarded the Purple Heart (1996), the Distinguished Service Cross (2002), and the U.S. Army Medal of Honor (2015) for his actions in the battle.
- James Henry Legg Jr. was awarded Croix de Guerre with a Bronze Star for his contributions at Blanc Mont in October 1918.
- Corporal Freddie Stowers was also awarded the Medal of Honor in 1991 for actions in the assault on Côte 188.
- Millicent Sylvia Armstrong was awarded the Croix de Guerre for bravery in rescuing wounded soldiers while under fire.
- Lt.-Gen. Sir James Melville Babington, Commander of the 23rd Division (United Kingdom)
- Lt. Fred Becker, the University of Iowa's first All-American left school to enlist prior to his senior season. Commissioned in the Army and assigned to a Marine platoon. KIA at Soissons, July 1918. Awarded the Distinguished Service Cross, Silver Star, and France awarded him the Croix de Guerre.
- Thomas Ricketts - Private, Royal Newfoundland Regiment - awarded the Croix de Guerre with Golden Star in 1919 for heroism on October 14, 1918.
- David Stuart Gaselee Burton, Flying Officer RAF.
- Hobey Baker, an American fighter pilot.
- Marc Bloch, French historian, joined the war as an infantry sergeant and ended it as a captain.
- Arthur Bluethenthal, All American football player and decorated World War I pilot.
- Solon Hannibal de la Mothe Borglum, for work with the Les Foyers du Soldat. American Sculptor.
- Annie Brewer was awarded the Légion d'Honneur and the Croix de Guerre, which makes her one of the most highly decorated nurses of any country in WW1
- Bl. Daniel Brottier, beatus in the Roman Catholic Church; acted as a military chaplain during the war.
- Stanley Melbourne Bruce, 1st Viscount Melbourne and later Prime Minister of Australia, in 1917.
- Eugene Bullard, wounded in the 1916 battles around Verdun, was awarded the Croix de Guerre for his heroism. Served with the Lafayette Flying Corps as the first African-American combat aviator.
- Georges Carpentier, Aviator during the war as well as a world champion boxer.
- Vernon Castle, Pilot in the Royal Flying Corps. Flying over the Western Front, he completed 300 combat missions and shot down two aircraft.
- Harry Cator, then a Serjeant in the 7th Battalion of the East Surrey Regiment of the British Army, awarded the Victoria Cross and the Croix de Guerre avec Palme for his heroism.
- Colonel Lawrence Moore Cosgrave DSO & Bar (August 28, 1890 – July 28, 1971) was the Canadian signatory to the Japanese Instrument of Surrender at the end of World War II.
- Father John B. DeValles, a chaplain with the Yankee Division, he was known as the "Angel of the Trenches" for his valiant deeds in caring for both Allied and German soldiers on the battlefields of France. Fr. DeValles was injured in a mustard gas attack while attending to a fallen soldier and died two years later.
- David Mcilvenny, from Belfast was an ambulance driver with the British Army Service Corp. Serving in Italy, he was first awarded the Military Medal for rescuing wounded under shell-fire. He subsequently received gunshots wounds to the face. He was awarded the Croix De Guerre in August 1918 for attending to severely wounded French troops in Italy.
- Cpl. George C. Doneworth, 84th Co., 3rd Bn., 6th Marines, USMC. Wounded four times in battle, including mustard gas, a bayonet through his thigh while jumping a German machine gun nest, a spinal injury (unbeknownst to him except for pain) from a broken piece of frozen ground hurled by a nearby artillery shell burst, and lastly a close-range rifle shot from a German soldier resulting in major head trauma at Belleau Wood on June 6, 1918; Col. Albertus Catlin had been shot that same day and place. That final head-wound in the eye socket, exiting at the temple near the ear, knocked him unconscious, and after being left for dead and waking later in the day near sunset, covered in blood, he walked back to U.S. lines and took two German prisoners while enroute. Upon arrival at the first friendly machine gun emplacement, he collapsed and was evacuated to a field hospital. Awarded the French Fourragère of the Order of the Legion of Honor for gallantry by a French General officer, an all-red in color rare award by the French. He was also awarded the Purple Heart and two wound stripes, and medals for Chateau Theirry COTE-204, the Ainse Defensive Sector (with 4 stars), and the 2nd Division Regulars, U.S. Army. Spent 3 years in hospital in France, Washington, DC and Baltimore, MD. When recovered, he returned to his home in Harrison, OH and created the first American Legion Post where he became Commander. He lived to the age of 88.
- William J. Donovan, legendary soldier and founder of the Office of Strategic Services. Awarded U.S. Medal of Honor, Distinguished Service Cross and Croix de Guerre with Palm and Silver Star.
- Edward Terence Donnelly, brigadier general and the commanding general of the 164th Field Artillery Brigade of the 89th Infantry Division.
- Otis B. Duncan, lieutenant-colonel in the 370th Infantry Regiment (United States) and highest-ranking African-American officer to serve in World War I combat.
- Lucius Loyd Durfee, brigadier general in the U.S. Army
- Ernest Fawcus, officer in the Northumberland Fusiliers and Royal Flying Corps, awarded the Croix de Guerre for leading successful bombing attacks.
- Lady Dorothie Feilding, a British volunteer nurse awarded the Croix de Guerre for bravery in the field.
- Maud Fitch, a volunteer ambulance driver from Eureka, Utah, was awarded the Croix de Guerre with a gold star for her courage rescuing wounded soldiers under heavy fire.
- George L. Fox, awarded the Croix de Guerre for his service on the Western Front. He was also one of the Four Chaplains who gave their lives when the troopships USAT Dorchester was hit by a torpedo and sank on February 3, 1943, during World War II.
- Robert Gauthiot, French Orientalist, linguist, and explorer, interrupted his exploration of the Pamir Mountains in July 1914 to return home to serve as a captain in the infantry. He received the Croix de Guerre before he was mortally wounded at the Second Battle of Artois in May 1916.
- Major Edwin L. Holton was awarded the Croix de Guerre for distinguished service as deputy commissioner of the American Red Cross in France in charge of re-education and rehabilitation of the disabled soldiers. He had a staff of 60 Red Cross Officials assisted by 15,000 workers. The staff he supervised helped 136,000 disabled soldiers of the 200,000 American wounded in WWI.
- William F Howe, Commanding Officer of 102nd Field Artillery Regiment on the Western Front
- Lieutenant-Colonel Harold Iremonger
- Bugler James A. Irwin of Company H, 30th Infantry, 3rd Infantry Division, awarded the Croix de Guerre with bronze star under order number 11.602 "D" dated November 15, 1918, General Headquarters, French Armies of the North and Northeast. Irwin "acted courageously in the engagements of June 7 and 8, 1918. As liaison agent with the battalion commander he displayed great courage and much presence of mind, succeeding under violent artillery and machine gun fire in carrying messages where others had been unable to go."
- Major General Charles E. Kilbourne who was also the first American to win the United States' three highest medals for bravery.
- American poet Joyce Kilmer (1886–1918), a sergeant and intelligence observer with the 69th Volunteer Infantry, 42nd Rainbow Division, was posthumously awarded the Croix de Guerre for service.
- Henry Louis Larsen, an American Marine commanding the 3rd Battalion 5th Marines during every major battle of the war in France involving the United States.
- E. Brooke Lee American Major from Maryland.
- Lily Lind, New Zealand nurse.
- Henri de Lubac, a Roman Catholic Jesuit novice serving in the Third Infantry Regiment, who was severely wounded in the head on 1 November 1917 while fighting near Verdun. He later became an influential Catholic theologian and Cardinal.
- Ronald Guy Lyster OBE, Surgeon Lieutenant for the Royal Navy
- Douglas MacArthur, U.S. General of the Army and Field Marshal of the Philippines, awarded two Croix de Guerre (one bronze palm and one silver-gilt star) for a nighttime trench raid with French troops that led to the capture of many German prisoners-of-war as a colonel and for a nighttime reconnaissance mission into no man's land to check if the enemy had withdrawn from their trenches or not as a brigadier general.
- William March, American writer, awarded the Croix de Guerre with palm.
- George C. Marshall, General of the Army and Secretary of State, awarded the Croix de Guerre with palm.
- Lawrence Dominic McCarthy, was also an Australian recipient of the Victoria Cross, the highest and most prestigious award for gallantry in the face of the enemy that can be awarded to British and Commonwealth forces.
- Horace McCoy, American novelist and screenwriter.
- Ruari McLean CBE (Royal Naval Volunteer Reserve), awarded in 1942, served in the Free French Submarine Rubis
- John McNulty (U.S. Marine Corps)
- Gustave A. Michalka, with two of his men he captured a machine gun by assault and killed the crew. By his bravery and prompt action he avoided losses in his platoon.
- Sgt. Palmer O. Narveson, along with two other men, was separated from his company near Bellicourt, France. He demolished a machine gun nest and reducing a second hostile position. He continued to advance, refusing to be evacuated, despite wounds and suffering the effects of gas.
- Joseph Oklahombi, American soldier of the Choctaw nation who was a Choctaw code talker
- George S. Patton, legendary American general.
- Waldo Peirce, American Red Cross volunteer (1918, for courage during the Vosges Hills Battle)
- Isabel Weld Perkins, for Red Cross volunteer work.
- Thomas A. Pope 1918 Corporal, U.S. Army; also earned the U.S. Army Medal of Honor, the British Distinguished Conduct Medal, and the Médaille militaire, for bravery displayed in Hamel, France.
- Eddie Rickenbacker, Captain and flying ace of the 94th Aero Squadron, United States Army Air Service, during World War I; also recipient of the U.S. Medal of Honor.
- James E. Rieger, Major (later Colonel), led a key attack during the Meuse-Argonne offensive. Also awarded the Distinguished Service Cross
- Harold W. Roberts was awarded the Croix de Guerre with bronze palm for his valor in the Battle of Meuse River-Argonne Forest, in which he died, near the town of Exermont, France. He was also awarded the Medal of Honor, the French Military Medal, and the Italian War Cross (all posthumously).
- Needham Roberts served with the 369th Infantry Division, better known as the Harlem Hellfighters or the Black Rattlers, a regiment consisted entirely of African Americans excepting their commanding officers. Roberts was the first American alongside Henry Johnson to receive the Croix de Guerre.
- Theodore Roosevelt Jr., son of President Theodore Roosevelt. Battalion commander in France.
- Milunka Savić, Serbian female non-commissioned officer was awarded the French Croix de Guerre 1914–1918 with Palm. She is the only woman in the world awarded this medal for service in World War I.
- James M. Sellers, president of Wentworth Military Academy and College and U.S. Marine. Awarded the Croix de Guerre for heroism at Belleau Wood
- Laurence Stallings, American writer.
- Donald Swartout, American Jackson, Michigan, intelligence pfc, Comp I, 128th Infantry, 32d Div. French Croix de Guerre with bronze palm," dated March 15, 1919, General Headquarters, French Armies of the East Marshal Petain for carrying important messages between Juvigny and Terny Sorny while wounded.
- Allen Melancthon Sumner, United States Marine Corps, killed in France in 1918, awarded the Croix de Guerre with gilt star.
- Stephen W. Thompson, aviator, was awarded the Croix de Guerre with palm. He is credited with the first aerial victory by the U.S. military.
- John Tovey, Royal Navy, later became a senior naval commander and an Admiral of the Fleet.
- Ludovicus Van Iersel, Dutch-American sergeant who won the Croix de Guerre twice while serving in France.
- Blake R. Van Leer, American engineer who was awarded the Croix de Guerre while serving as a Colonel for the Corps of Engineers in France.
- James Waddell was one of New Zealand's most highly decorated soldiers of the First World War. Waddell was received in the French Legion of Honour and promoted twice. He was also awarded the French Croix de Guerre seven times during the war.
- Herbert Ward, artist, sculptor and African explorer, awarded the Croix de Guerre while serving with the British Ambulance Committee in the Vosges
- Edwin "Pa" Watson, served in France. Earning the U.S. Army Silver Star and the Croix de Guerre from the French government.
- William A. Wellman, American fighter pilot in the Lafayette Flying Corps, awarded Croix de Guerre with two palm leaves, 1918
- Samuel Woodfill, an American infantry lieutenant who disabled several German machine-gun nests and killed many enemy combatants with rifle, pistol and pickaxe. He was awarded the American Medal of Honor and the French Croix de Guerre.
- Alvin C. York was awarded the Croix de Guerre with bronze palm for his valor in the Battle of Meuse River-Argonne Forest near the town of Verdun, France. Also awarded the American Medal of Honor.
- Archibald James Fergusson Eden, Brigadier General in the British Army.
- Virginia Hall Goillot DSC, Croix de Guerre, MBE(April 6, 1906 – July 8, 1982), code named Marie and Diane, was an American who worked with the United Kingdom's clandestine Special Operations Executive (SOE) and the American Office of Strategic Services (OSS) in France during World War II. The objective of SOE and OSS was to conduct espionage, sabotage and reconnaissance in occupied Europe against the Axis powers, especially Nazi Germany. (SOE)and (OSS) agents in France allied themselves with resistance groups and supplied them with weapons and equipment parachuted in from England. After World War II Hall worked for the Special Activities Division of the Central Intelligence Agency (CIA).
- Charles Dinsmore Davis, American sergeant Company F, 321st infantry, 81st Division; and later, member of Little Rock, Arkansas City Council. "Sargeant Charles D. Davis who acted as a liaison runner between the Second Battalion and the French Division on the left, reaching hid destination by passing thru 'No Man's Land' between two companies of the 322nd infantry and the enemy, and bringing back to his battalion commander accurate advice of the situation not only of the French troops, but of the companies of the 322nd infantry and of the companies of his own battalion.
- Georgette Degund, French woman who chased a German soldier through the streets hit him on the head with a snowball and made him fall down. Citation reads: "“DEGUND, Georgette, le d’une vaillance et d’une cner le remarquatics. Le Ier Janvier 1918, n’e pas hesitcr a attiquer, seule, Un spirant, representant une section de chasscurs, L’a poursuivi et, d’une seule boule de neiae ( Grenads ) l’a culbute.” L”avait aucune citation juis le marrte boutCL Un Consequence, nous, les I. T. D. Presente citation done droit au purt ce la euaille militalle et ce L Croix de Guerre Avec palme."
- John P. Stein, Chief Mechanic of the 117th Trench Mortar Battery, of the 42nd (Rainbow) Division, in action in the Battle of Bacarrat, while under the heavy shelling of a trench mortar battery on the afternoon of March 9, 1918, where, in the open and without protection, he repaired trench mortars which had been knocked out of action by shellfire.

=== Individuals in World War II ===
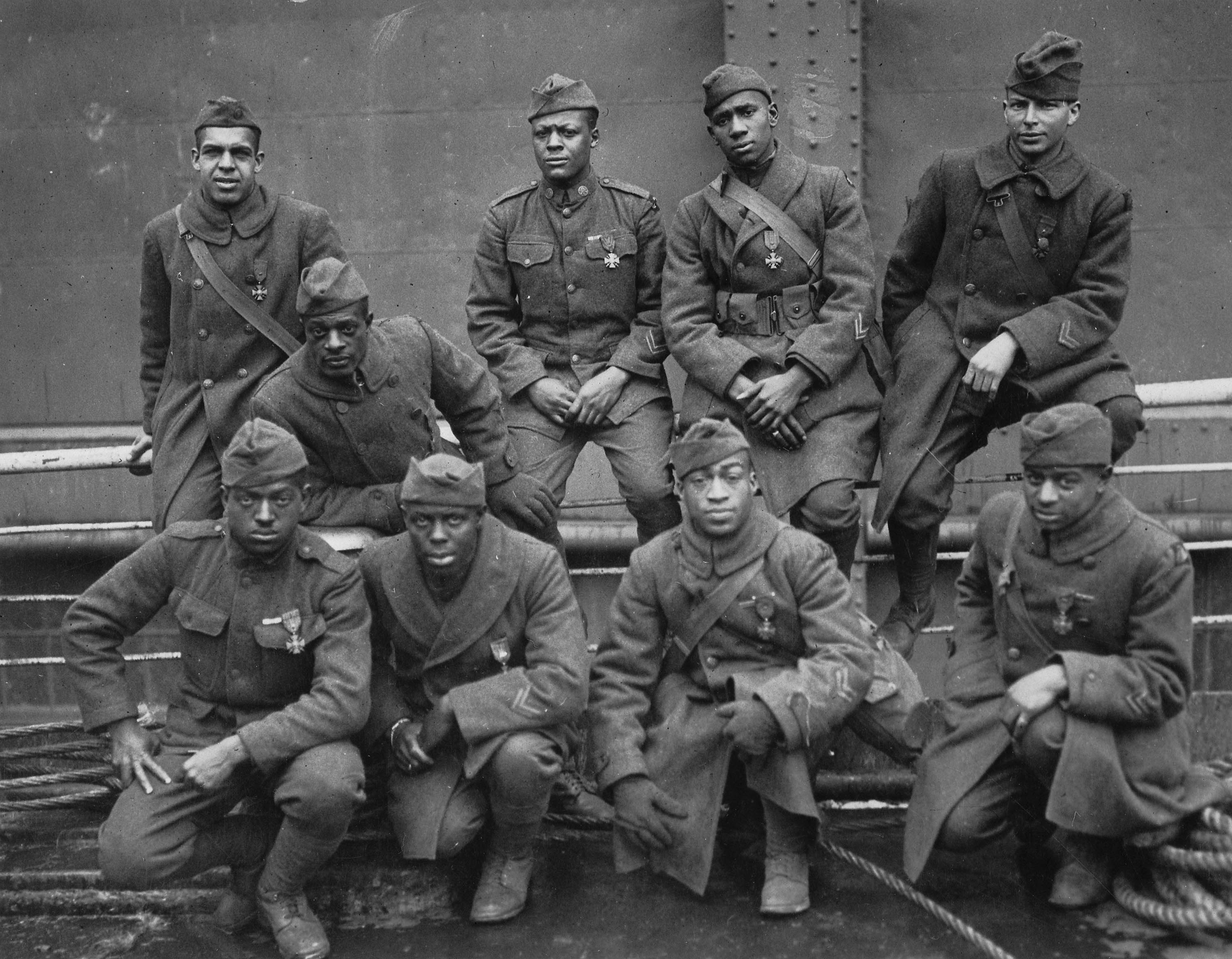
Doughboys of the 369th Infantry Regiment posing after World War I with their Croix de Guerre medals

- Jehan Alain, French organist and composer. Engaged with enemy, single-handedly killing 16 with carbine before being killed himself.
- Władysław Anders, Polish general, commander of the 2nd Polish Corps, 1943–46.
- Vera Atkins, assistant to head and intelligence officer of the French section of Special Operations Executive (SOE).
- John Beech Austin, Squadron Leader in both the RAF and the SOE.
- Ralph Chamberlain, returned on two separate occasions to an active mine field to rescue several badly injured soldiers. Awarded the Croix de Guerre with Palm Leaf for bravery and services rendered to Belgium.
- Maurice Bambier, French politician and former Mayor of Montataire, awarded the French Croix de Guerre for his services during the Dunkirk evacuation.
- Josephine Baker, American-born French dancer, singer and actress, for her work in the French Resistance.
- Samuel Beckett, awarded the Croix de Guerre by General Charles de Gaulle in March 1945.
- Marcel Bigeard, highly decorated French general and veteran of World War II, French Indochina and Algeria; received both the Croix de Guerre 1939–1945 and the Croix de guerre TOE with a total of 25 citations, including 17 palms.
- Robert M. Blackburn, American, Fighter pilot, Des Moines, Iowa, 405th Fighter Group, flew over 117 missions over enemy territory, Distinguished Flying Cross with Oak Leaf Cluster, Air medal with 21 Oak Leaf Clusters, purple heart, Silver Star, shot down near Dortmund, Germany, and killed after capture by SS Officer on March 25, 1945 [War Department].
- Mary E. Blanshard (Hall), British-born, saboteur, spy. Engaged in work with French Resistance.
- Albert Browne-Bartroli, Special Operations Executive agent in Burgundy, France
- Gabriel Brunet de Sairigné, French colonel who participated with the Free French Forces to the East African campaign (in Eritrea and Syria), the Tunisia Campaign, the Allied invasion of Sicily, the Operation Dragoon and the campaign of Alsace.
- Phil H. Bucklew, US naval officer; "Father of American Naval Special Warfare".
- Frederick Walker Castle, U.S. Army Air Forces general and posthumous recipient of the Medal of Honor
- Thomas Cassilly, 104th Infantry Division. Awarded the Bronze Star, the Purple Heart, and the French Croix de Guerre. Retired US State Department Foreign Service Officer and International Relations Professor.
- Peter Churchill. Special Operations Executive officer in French section.
- Jacques Cousteau, aqualung inventor, diver and underwater film maker.
- Ève Curie, Author, war correspondent, lieutenant in the 1st Armored Division, "First Lady of UNICEF"
- Lionel Guy D'Artois, Canadian Army officer and SOE agent; awarded the Croix de Guerre for service with the Interior French Forces in occupied France.
- Philippe Daudy, journalist and novelist.
- Avery Dulles, S.J., awarded the Croix de Guerre for his liaison work with the French Navy.
- Dwight D. Eisenhower, Supreme Allied Commander during the liberation of France.
- Frantz Fanon, awarded the Croix de Guerre by Raoul Salan for service in the French Free Forces in North Africa and Alsace.
- Carl Gustav Fleischer, Norwegian general, who won the first major victory against the German Axis forces.
- Stephen Galatti, Director of AFS, American Field Service
- Laure Gatet, French biochemist and a spy for the French Resistance.
- Francis Grevemberg, United States lieutenant colonel, later superintendent of Louisiana's state police.
- William Grover-Williams, Grand Prix driver and network organiser in the French section of the SOE
- Thomas "Loel" Guinness, Group Captain and pilot
- Tony Halik Polish pilot in RAF; after being the only Polish/RAF pilot shot down over France, he joined the French resistance.
- Virginia Hall American spy who operated in occupied France. The Gestapo considered her "the most dangerous of all Allied spies". Awarded the Croix de Guerre avec Palme.
- Bob Hoover, Army Air Corps pilot and USAF test pilot
- John Howard, awarded the Croix de Guerre in 1944 for his valor. When his ship struck a mine off the French coast, killing the captain, Howard took over command and fought valiantly to save his ship and crew, even jumping into the sea to rescue wounded sailors.
- Agnès Humbert, art historian, was awarded the Croix de Guerre with silver gilt palm, for heroism in her work in the French Resistance.
- Charles F. Irving, 2LT. 2nd Armored Division, U.S. Army, was awarded the Croix de Guerre in 1944 for heroism in action for the liberation of France.
- Whitfield Jack, colonel under General Matthew Ridgway in Ruhr Valley campaign; major general later in United States Army Reserve
- Olivia Jordan, ambulance driver and interpreter/driver to Charles de Gaulle 1940 - 1943
- Maria Justeau, French Resistance heroine.
- Noor Inayat Khan, a wireless operator in the French section of the SOE. She was flown to occupied France in June 1944 and operated until mid. October. Captured and tortured, she was eventually executed at Dachau concentration camp on 13 September 1944; awarded the George Cross posthumously.
- Bernard Knox, English-born classicist and author, who served with the U.S. Army during WWII and was awarded the Croix de Guerre avec Palme for his service with the French Resistance during Operation Jedburgh.
- Jan Kubiš, Czechoslovak paratrooper and assassin of Reichsprotektor of Bohemia and Moravia, SS-Obergruppenführer Reinhard Heydrich, in 1942 as part of Operation Anthropoid.
- James Harry Lacey 'Ginger'. R.A.F. Battle of Britain Ace - Awarded May 1940, but not presented until 1983.
- John C. H. Lee, Lt. Gen, Commander of the Com-Z and Army Service Forces in the ETO, May 1942 to Dec. 1945
- Curtis E. LeMay, awarded the French Croix de Guerre with palm.
- Aimé Lepercq, awarded the Croix de Guerre for his valor in both World Wars.
- Lt. Colonel Charles F. Lewis, 344th Engineers Battalion. Awarded the French Croix de Guerre for bridge work on the Rhone.
- Major Desmond Longe, SOE agent and commander of Mission Eucalyptus. Awarded the French Croix de Guerre with palm.
- Douglas MacArthur, U.S. General of the Army and Field Marshal of the Philippines, awarded the Croix de Guerre with bronze palm.
- Lt. Colonel Montie Magree M.D., 329th Medical Battalion. Born in Maywood, Illinois died Long Beach, California. Awarded the French Croix de Guerre
- André Malraux French novelist, art theorist and Minister for Cultural Affairs.
- George C. Marshall, General of the Army and Secretary of State, awarded the Croix de Guerre with palm.
- Jean Mayer, future president of Tufts University, awarded for his courage and bravery.
- Lt.Colonel Blair "Paddy" Mayne, British Special Air Service, Croix de Guerre with Palm. Awarded Légion d'honneur, awarded the Distinguished Service Order (UK) four times.
- William A. McNulty, a WWII U.S. Army field commander
- General Dragoljub Mihailovic, Serbian officer and Allied resistance leader of the Royal Yugoslav Army in Fatherland, awarded by Charles de Gaulle.
- Paul de Montgolfier, fighter pilot for the French Air Force.
- Edmond J. Moran, led tug fleet on D-Day, one of the most influential figures in 20th-century U.S. shipping history.
- Audie Murphy, American actor; most decorated U.S. Army soldier during the war, was awarded the French "Croix de Guerre avec Palme" three times and the Belgian Croix de Guerre with Palm once, as well as the American Medal of Honor.
- Leonard W. Murray, Canadian admiral, awarded the Croix de Guerre with bronze palm for his role in the Battle of the Atlantic.
- Eileen Nearne, member of the UK's SOE. She served in occupied France as a radio operator under the codename "Rose".
- John B. Oakes, future editor of The New York Times; awarded for his counter-espionage activities with the Office of Strategic Services (OSS).
- Marcel Oopa, Polynesian politician.
- Peter J. Ortiz, Marine officer; member, Office of Strategic Services (OSS).
- George S. Patton, U.S. Army general. Awarded for leading U.S. Third Army during the liberation of France.
- Jean-Claude Pascal (1927–1992), awarded the Croix de Guerre for his military valor.
- Andrée Peel (1905–2010), French Resistance member.
- Col. David E. Pergrin, awarded the Croix de Guerre for service during the Battle of the Bulge.
- Harry Peulevé, a wireless operator and organiser in the French Section of the SOE.
- Prince Philip, awarded the Croix de Guerre in 1948 for service in the Royal Navy.
- Abbé Pierre (1912–2007), French Roman Catholic cleric; founder of Emmaus.
- Forrest Pogue, US Army combat historian.
- Jacques Poirier, Special Operations Executive (SOE) agent and member of the French Resistance
- Rainier III, Prince of Monaco, decorated with the Croix de Guerre for service with the Free French army.
- Russell Roach, American corporal of A Company, 3rd US Infantry Regiment (The Old Guard), awarded the Croix de Guerre 1939–1945 in 1944 for his bravery and valor during the Liberation of France during his campaign in Rhineland, Germany.
- James N. Robertson, member of the Pennsylvania House of Representatives (1949–1952), Brigadier General in the Pennsylvania National Guard
- James E. Robinson Jr., American artillery officer who assumed command of a depleted infantry company and took the city of Kressbach.
- Lowell Ward Rooks, American army officer.
- Robert Rosenthal of the Eighth Air Force of the USAF.
- Guy de Rothschild, awarded the Croix de Guerre for his military valor.
- Philippe de Rothschild, awarded the Croix de Guerre for his service with the Free French Forces.
- Alexander Sachal, Russian artist who joined the French Resistance; awarded the Croix de Guerre.
- Leo Genn, Lt.Col. RA, awarded the Croix de Guerre in 1945.

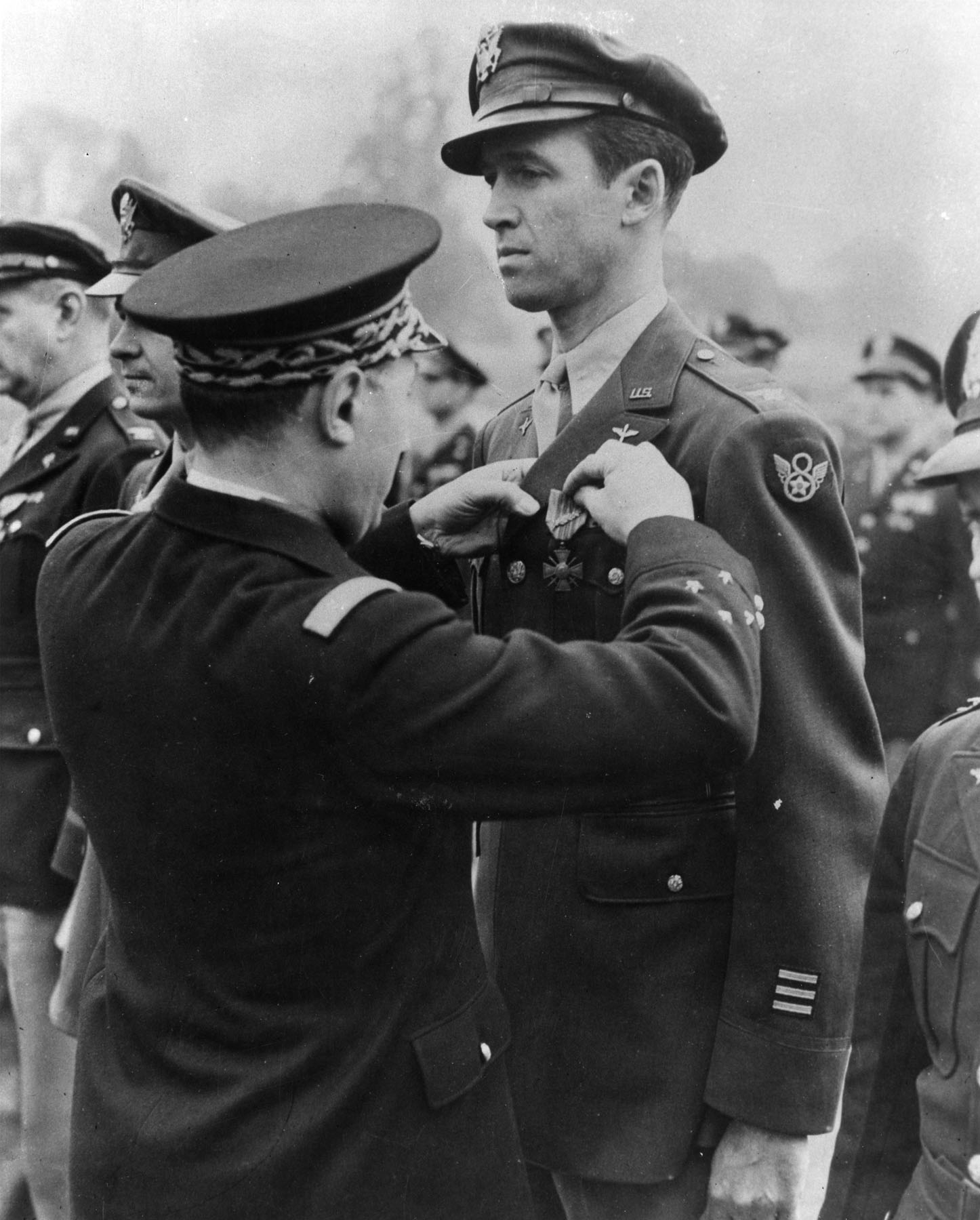
Colonel Jimmy Stewart being awarded the Croix de Guerre with Palm in 1944

- George Scales, British farmer/Commanding Officer LCT-7011 awarded the Croix de Guerre during D-Day. Presented to him in 2007 by French Attache Naval, Capitaine de Vaisseau Jean Nicolas Gauthier of the Ministere de la Defense.
- Desmond J. Scott, New Zealand fighter pilot and Group Captain who flew for the RAF. He was awarded both the Belgian and the French Croix de Guerre.
- Major Edward Cecil Scott, A Battery Commander, 5 Canadian Anti-Tank Regiment, for actions taken during the Battle of the Falaise Pocket
- Jan Smuts, South African Prime Minister.
- Raymond Franklin Gibson, American Ambulance Corp. Macon, Georgia.
- Mahmoud Harbi, Vice President of the Government Council of French Somaliland.
- George Reginald Starr, Special Operations Executive.
- James Stewart, American actor awarded the Croix de Guerre with Palm in 1944.
- Violette Szabo, a British SOE agent who was sent into occupied France. Her first mission was a success, but during her second mission she was captured and tortured. Eventually sent to Ravensbruck concentration camp, she was executed on 5 February 1945 (at age 23); awarded the George Cross posthumously.
- Alfred Touny (1886–1944), a leader of the French Resistance, now buried in the Mémorial de la France combattante.
- James Tracey, 3191945 Private in the 6th (Border) Battalion - King's Own Scottish Borderers; At Evrecy, in July 1944, he was with his CO (Lieutenant-Colonel J.G. Shillington) on a visit to a forward Convoy when a shell exploded nearby severely wounding the CO. Pte Tracey, though wounded himself by the blast, showed great presence of mind, tended to his CO's wounds and got him back to the Regimental Aid Post in his carrier then returned to Battalion HQ to report before going back himself. Awarded the Croix de Guerre with Bronze Star.
- Matt Urban, highly decorated American combat soldier with awards including the Medal of Honor and 7 Purple Hearts
- Nancy Wake of the SOE was the highest decorated Allied servicewoman of the war. Awarded the Croix de Guerre three times for service with the French maquis.
- F.F.E. Yeo-Thomas, member of RF Section of the SOE. A Special Operations Executive Liaison officer, he worked with the Bureau Central de Renseignements et d'Action (BCRA) of the Free French forces organising and coordinating resistance in both Vichy and Occupied France.
- US Army Staff Sergeant Joseph R. Beyrle
- Major Richard D. Winters, fought with Easy Company, 506th Parachute Infantry Regiment, 101st Airborne Division from the Normandy invasion to Operation Market Garden to the Battle of the Bulge. He was besieged at Bastogne and aided with taking of Hitler's Eagle's Nest in Austria.
- Jack M. Greener, Medic, K Company - 409th Regiment (103rd Infantry). In addition to the Croix de Guerre he received a Purple Heart, Bronze Star and Silver Star with Silver Oakleaf Cluster
- Colonel Donald J. Richardson earned Croix de Guerre with gold star. Commander of the 2nd battalion, 304th infantry of the 76th division, also receiving silver star, bronze star with oak leaf cluster, purple heart and Legion of Merit after his death in 1965. Served as Colonel in Korea, 8th Army, and later as senior military advisor in the Connecticut National Guard.
- First Sgt. Edward J. Stone of the US Army 40th General Hospital in Paris was awarded the Croix de Guerre with bronze star two times for his service during World War II.
- Glenn Wayne Ferguson an American while serving in the French Foreign Legion during Desert Storm was awarded the Croix du Guerre TOE etoile du bronze was mentioned in dispatches at Brigade level.
- Howard Warren Clark, USMA 1941, XX Corps, Patton's 3rd Army, Corps of Engineers, awarded French Croix de Guerre with Palm for valorous actions during assaults
- Mohammad Reza Pahlavi, Shah of Iran.

=== Other recipients ===
During World War I, Cher Ami, a carrier pigeon with the 77th Division, helped save the lives of 194 American soldiers by carrying a message across enemy lines in the heat of battle. Cher Ami was shot in the chest and leg, losing most of the leg to which the message was attached, and blinded in one eye, but continued the 25-mile flight avoiding shrapnel and poison gas to get the message home. Cher Ami was awarded the French Croix de Guerre with Palm for heroic service. He later died from the wounds received in battle and was enshrined in the Smithsonian Institution.

Aram Karamanoukian, a lieutenant-general of the Syrian army of Armenian descent, who participated in the First Arab-Israeli war, was awarded the Croix de Guerre.

== See also ==
- Croix de Guerre (Belgium)
- Ribbons of the French military and civil awards
- Croix-de-Feu, a French far right group in the Interwar period mainly comprising veterans decorated with the Croix de Guerre
- Awards and decorations of the United States military
- French medals: Croix de la Légion d'Honneur; Croix de la Libération; Croix de la Valeur Militaire
- Vietnamese Gallantry Cross, a South Vietnamese military decoration closely based on the Croix de Guerre
- List of recipients of the Croix de Guerre
