= Edward Donnelly =

Edward Donnelly may refer to:

- Edward Terence Donnelly (1871–1929), United States Army officer
- J. Edward Donnelly, American football coach and college athletics administrator
- Ed Donnelly (1910s pitcher) (1879–1957), 1910–1911 Boston Braves baseball pitcher
- Ed Donnelly (1950s pitcher) (1932–1992), 1959 Chicago Cubs baseball pitcher
