= David James Nielson =

British soldier and businessman (1912–1985)

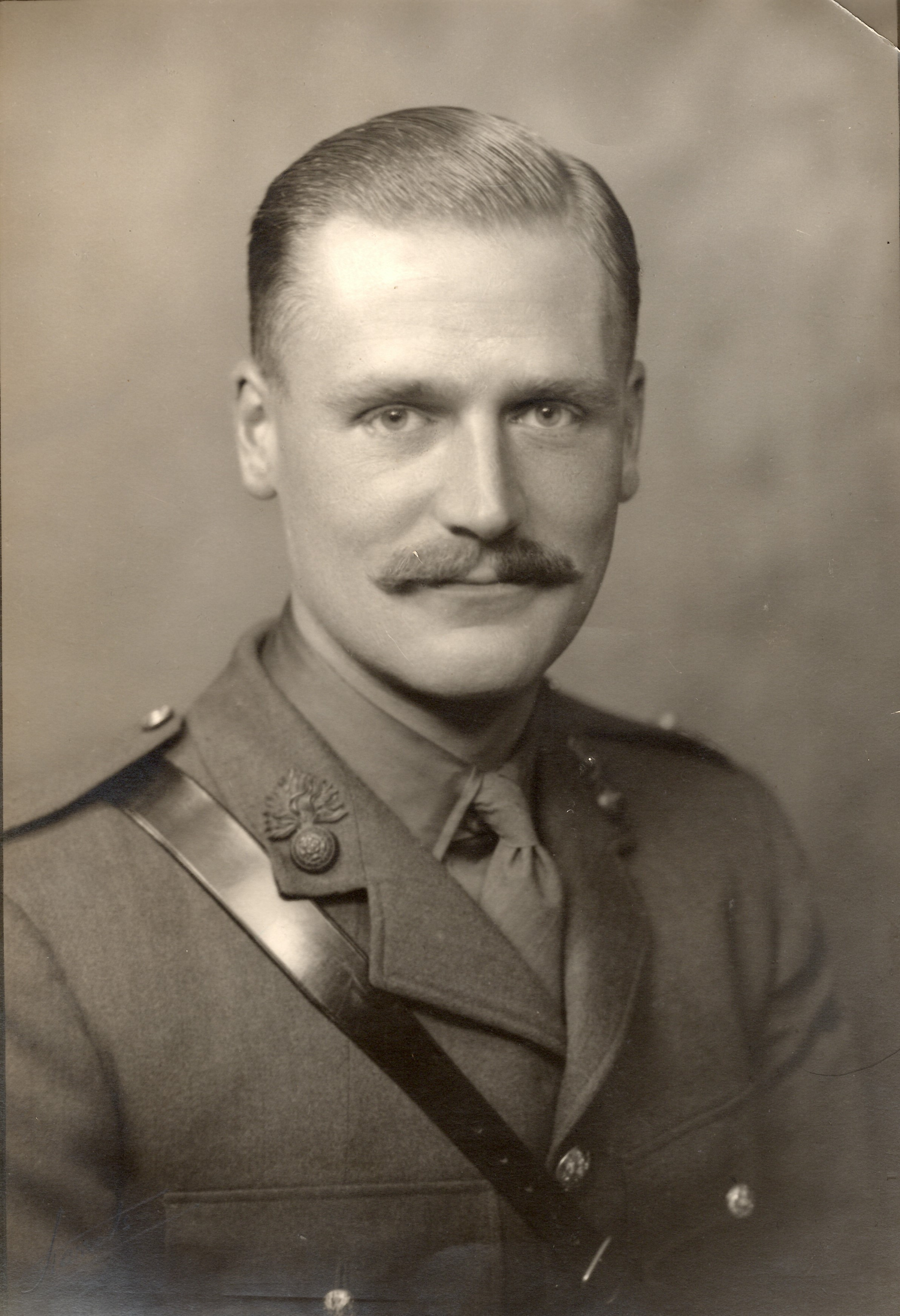
- Nielson's military portrait.
- Born: 12 October 1912; South Kensington, London
- Died: March 31, 1985 (aged 72); Malmesbury, Wiltshire
- Military career
- Allegiance: United Kingdom
- Branch: British Army; SOE
- Service years: 1939–1946
- Rank: Lieutenant Colonel
- Unit: Team CECIL
- Conflicts: World War II
- Awards: Croix de Guerre; 1939–1945 Star; France and Germany Star; Defence Medal; War Medal 1939–1945; Efficiency Medal

David James Nielson (12 October 1912 – 31 March 1985) was a British soldier and businessman. He served as part of Team CECIL, which assisted the liberation of France in 1944. He was awarded the honorary rank of Lieutenant Colonel.

== Early life and education ==
Nielson was born in South Kensington, London on 12 October 1912, the only son of Joseph Nielson Jr. and Euphemia Arnolt Anderson. His sister, Edna Josephine Nielson, was born on 5 September 1906. Nielson was educated at Margate College, and then the Château de Boulains University, near Fontainebleau in France. Here, he learnt French, which would later allow him to qualify for the British SOE during World War Two.

== Military service ==
Nielson served as a territorial with the Honourable Artillery Company regiment of the British Army in the 1930s, and was commissioned into the 12th Battalion of the Royal Fusiliers at the outbreak of the Second World War as a Second Lieutenant. In 1943, his fluency in the French language allowed him to become a candidate for Operation Jedburgh, an operation headed by British Special Operations Executive (SOE), the U.S. Office of Strategic Services (OSS), and the Free French Bureau central de renseignements et d'action ("Central Bureau of Intelligence and Operations"). By this time, he had reached the rank of Captain. After joining, he qualified as an instructor for the operation, where he was responsible for training men who were to be parachuted into occupied territories at Milton Hall.

In 1944, he was offered the chance to become operational, and was promoted to the rank of Major. He was instated as the commander of team CECIL, composed of himself, French Captain Alfred Kayser, operating under the nom-de-guerre Alfred Frayant, and radio operator Sergeant R. Wilde. On 25 August 1944, team CECIL took off from RAF Harrington in a B-24J Liberator piloted by Maurice Jacobson, and at 1:54am on 26 August 1944, they parachuted just south of Troyes, in the Aube department in France. There, he organised the defence of four bridges in Aube between Arcis and Brenne, with minimal losses for the Maquis, allowing American troops to continue their rapid advance, and later led multiple successful ambushes. For this, he was awarded the Croix de Guerre with silver gilt star. He remained working with the Maquis until the country was entirely free when, after a week in liberated Paris, he returned to England.

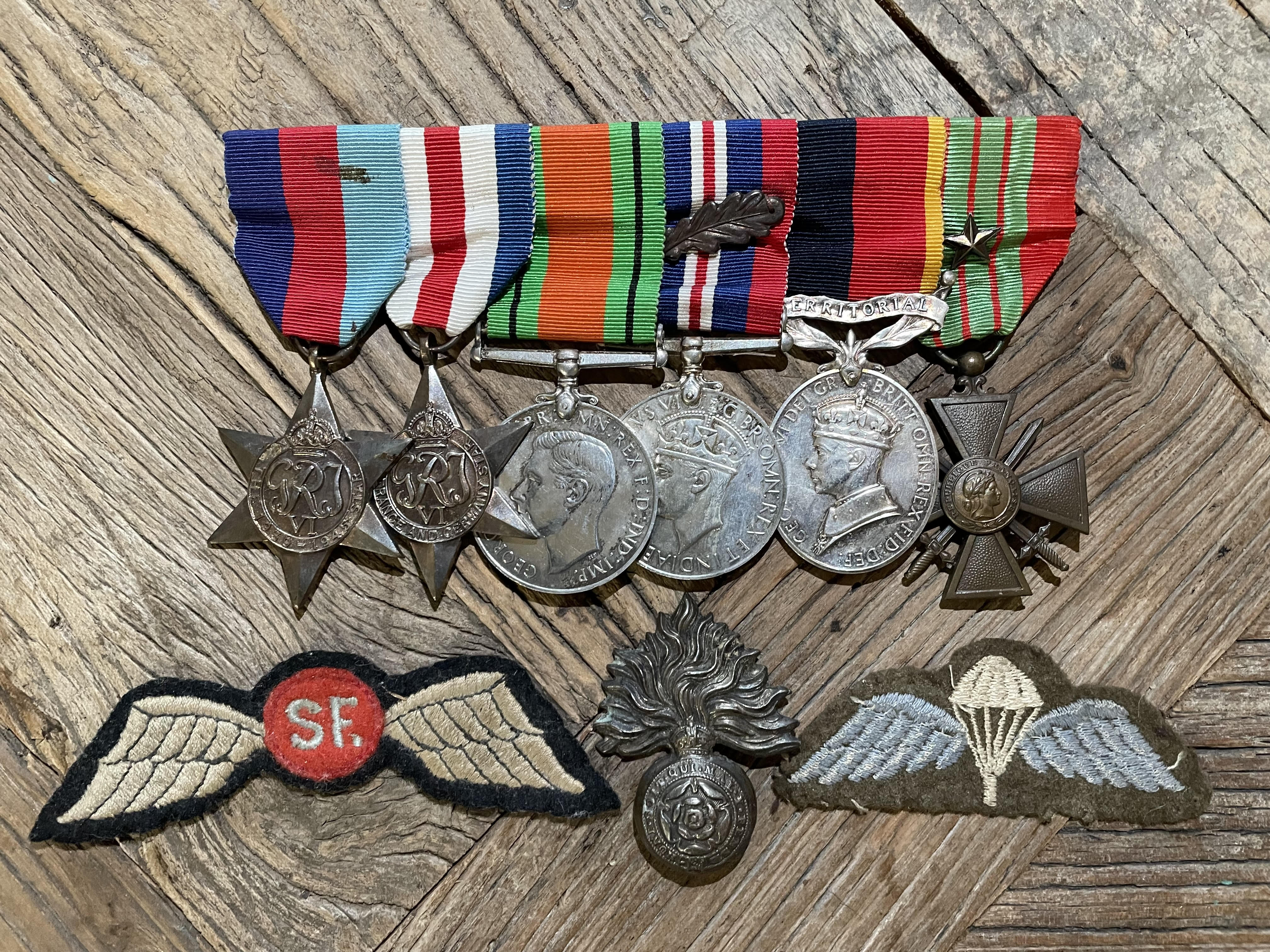
Nielson's accolades

Soon afterwards, he was sent back to France to report to S.H.A.E.F. in Versailles, where he was given an assignment in Field Intelligence which took him to Germany. He was demobilised from Frankfurt in 1946 after being awarded the honorary rank of Lieutenant Colonel.

=== Awards ===
Throughout his military career, he was awarded the Croix de Guerre with silver gilt star, the 1939–1945 Star, the France and Germany Star, the Defence Medal, the War Medal 1939–1945 with an Oak Leaf, the Efficiency Medal (HAC), and was mentioned in despatches (MiD). Among his personal effects, he also kept his SF Wings, his Parachutist Badge, and his Royal Fusiliers Cap Badge.

== Career ==
In 1930 Nielson joined Glanvill Enthoven & Co., the Lloyd's insurance brokers, but after four years, left to join J. Gliksten & Son, the timber importers, with whom he would spend 19 years.

After his demobilisation in 1946, Nielson returned to J. Gliksten & Son. He remained with them until 1953 when he joined the United Africa Company as a Sales Manager. He was appointed to the board in 1957. As a Sales Director, he travelled extensively to West and South Africa, the United States, Egypt, Israel, and many other European countries.

In 1962, he joined the board of Palm Line and was subsequently appointed a Director of Palm Line, and Chairman of African Container Express. In March 1967, Nielson became the Chairman of Palm Line, becoming the fifth Chairman of the company since its formation.

== Family life ==
He married Phyllis Edith Hadler on 23 December 1938, and had one child, Anthony David John Nielson, born on 1 January 1942.

=== Death ===
David died on 31 March 1985 in Malmesbury, Wiltshire, England at the age of 72.
