= James E. Rieger =

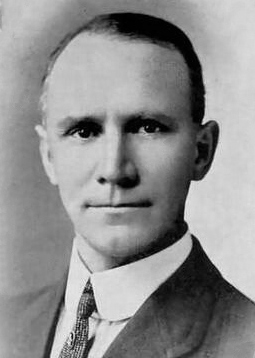
- Born: September 20, 1870; Peoria, Illinois, US
- Died: July 1, 1951 (aged 80); Kirksville, Missouri, US
- Burial place: Highland Park Cemetery, Kirksville, Missouri, US
- Military career
- Allegiance: United States
- Branch: United States Army; Missouri National Guard
- Rank: Colonel
- Nickname: Hero of the Argonne
- Unit: 35th Infantry Division
- Commands: 138th Regiment; 2nd Battalion 139th Infantry Regiment
- Conflicts: Pancho Villa Expedition; World War I
- Awards: Distinguished Service Cross; Croix de Guerre; Purple Heart
- Other work: Lawyer, judge.

James Edward Rieger (September 20, 1870 – July 1, 1951) was an American lawyer and United States Army officer from the state of Missouri. He was awarded the Distinguished Service Cross, America's second-highest award for valor, and the Croix de Guerre from the government of France for his actions during the Meuse-Argonne Offensive during World War I.

== Early life and career ==
James E. Rieger was born September 20, 1870, in Peoria County, Illinois, to German immigrant parents Gottfried and Rose (Bruning) Rieger. He was the middle child of eight children. In 1880 the Rieger family moved to Kirksville, Missouri, where James' father intended to continue his vocation as a coopersmith and farmer. However in July 1881 Gottfried Rieger died followed by his son Christopher in September, 1881. James Rieger received his primary and secondary education in Peoria and the rural schools of Adair County, Missouri, before matriculating at the First District Normal School (now Truman State University) in Kirksville. Thereafter he worked as a public school teacher for two years. Rieger then continued his higher education at the University of Missouri in Columbia, Missouri, where he earned his law degree in 1897. After passing the Missouri Bar he returned to Kirksville and established a private law practice in 1898. James Rieger served as Adair County Prosecuting attorney from 1909 to 1911. He also held various other elected and politically appointed positions, including City Clerk for Kirksville, chairman of the county Democratic committee, and vice-president of the school board.

== Military career ==
Having been active in the Cadet Corps while at the University of Missouri, Rieger joined the Missouri Militia as a private soon after returning to Kirksville and establishing his law practice. He was instrumental in the formation of the Kirksville Company C in January 1900 and was elected an officer, and later commander, of Company C of the Fourth Regiment. In 1916 now-Major Rieger and the 2nd battalion, 4th Regiment joined a fellow northeast Missourian, General John J. Pershing on the Mexican border in pursuit of bandit Pancho Villa. Following the United States' entry into World War I, the Missouri Militia was mustered into federal service on August 5 and combined with units from Kansas to create the 35th Infantry Division.

Arriving in France the following spring, the 35th was held largely in reserve until the Meuse-Argonne offensive in late September, 1918. Then-Major Rieger, in command of 2nd Battalion, 139th Regiment, led his men in a successful frontal attack on Vauquois Hill, considered the strongest point on the Hindenburg Line between Verdun and Aisne. After regrouping his battalion, Rieger led them across the Aire river through heavy enemy artillery and machine gun fire to capture the key village of Exermont. Their defenses broken, the Germans fell back all along the front. For his actions Major Rieger was hailed as "the Hero of the Argonne" by French and American press. He was also promoted to Lieutenant Colonel, assigned as commander, 138th Regiment, and awarded the Distinguished Service Cross, the French Croix de Guerre, the Purple Heart for wounds received during the battle, and four other medals for meritorious service. Colonel Rieger's D.S.C. citation reads as follows:

The Distinguished Service Cross is presented to James E. Rieger, Lieutenant Colonel, U.S. Army, for extraordinary heroism in action near Charpentry, France, September 27, 1918. Lieutenant Colonel Rieger commanded the battalion which had, with conspicuous gallantry, captured Vauquois Hill and the Bois-de-Rosignel, and which was later held up for some hours in front of Charpentry by severe artillery and machine-gun fire. He placed himself in front of all his men, and thus starting them forward led them to the attack with such speed and dash that a large number of the enemy were cut off and captured. General Orders No. 59, W.D., 1919

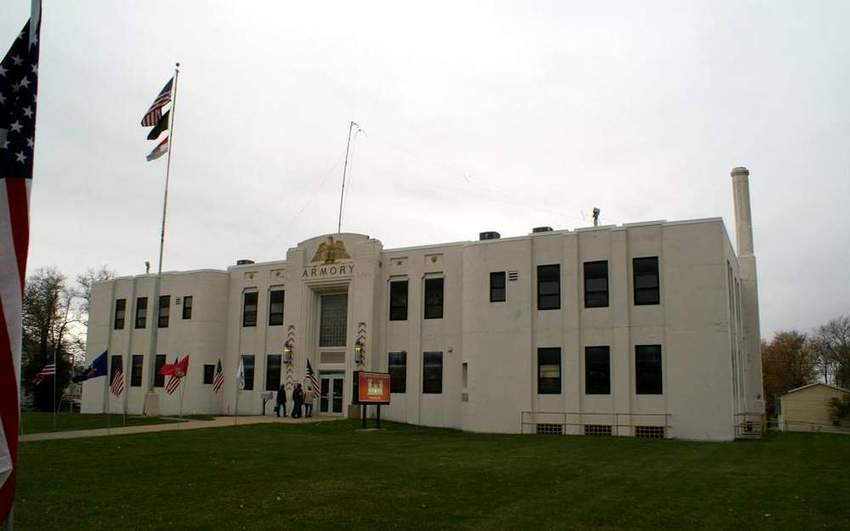
Rieger Armory in Kirksville, Missouri. Constructed in the mid-1930s, it was named in honor of Colonel Rieger.

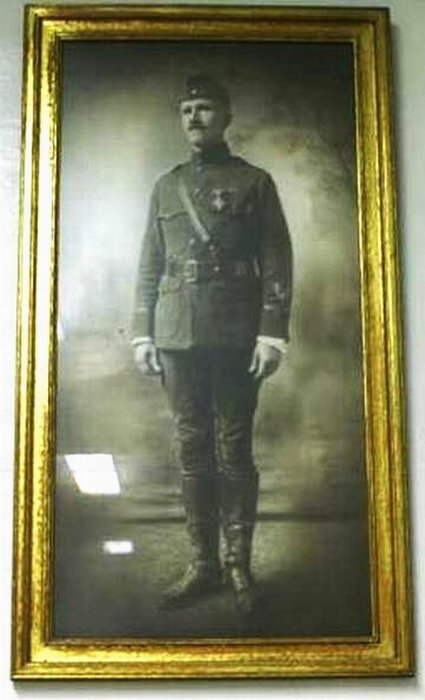
Photo of Col. Rieger in uniform shortly after World War I. This photo hangs inside Rieger Armory, named in his honor.

German howitzer, Kirksville, Missouri. Captured by 35th Division. Presented to Col. James Rieger and the city of Kirksville.

== Hometown hero ==
After returning to the US in the spring of 1919, Colonel Rieger resumed his law practice in Kirksville. Speaking of their battlefield commander on May 9, 1919, two mustered out soldiers told the Columbia Evening Missourian newspaper

"We had a Major from Kirksville. His name was James E. Rieger" said one. "He was the major of second battalion. He would do his best for us and there wasn't one of us that wouldn't go to Hell for him." "He surely ought to be made governor of Missouri" interrupted another.

However higher political office wasn't in Colonel Rieger's plans. Other than serving as a special judge when asked, he was mostly content to live a quiet life as a small-town lawyer. In 1938 Rieger returned to France at the behest of Missouri Governor Lloyd Stark as part of a three-man commission to inspect the gravesites of fallen Missourians. It was also in 1938 a new Missouri National Guard armory was constructed in Kirksville and was named Rieger Armory in his honor. Two other vestiges of his military service remain in the town as well. While overseas Rieger obtained several pieces of stained glass from a bombed-out cathedral in Verdun, France. These were shipped to Kirksville and fashioned into a window for the First Baptist Church, where the Colonel served as a deacon. A grateful War Department also granted Kirksville a German howitzer captured by the 35th Division during the fighting near Charpentry, France. It serves as a sentinel for the memorial to servicemen and women from Adair County, Missouri. James E. Rieger died July 1, 1951, in Kirksville and is buried in that city's Highland Park Cemetery.

== Family ==
On August 25, 1900, James Rieger married Alma Wray of Davis County, Iowa, and two children were born to them: Wray Montgomery, Nathaniel Brewning, and two children were adopted Evelyn, and Ruth. Both sons followed their father into military service. Wray Rieger served in the Missouri National Guard while also serving as a Professor of Chemistry and Science at Kirksville State Teachers College. During World War II he was an active duty U.S. Army officer in the China Burma India Theater, retiring from military service in 1946 with the rank of Colonel. Younger brother Nathaniel became a lawyer like his father before him. His work for Union Electric Company in land acquisition played an important role in the creation of Lake of the Ozarks. As was the family tradition, Nathaniel Rieger was also an officer in the Missouri National Guard. Called to active duty in 1940, he served in Alaska and other Pacific Theater postings, mostly as a staff officer of the Army Judge Advocate General's Corps (JAG). Shortly after the war ended he accepted a commission as a regular Army officer, continuing his work with the JAG Corps. He served in Korea during the Korean War and several notable positions thereafter including Commandant of the Judge Advocate General's School and as Army Judge Advocate General for Europe. Nathaniel Rieger earned the Legion of Merit with Oak Leaf Cluster and a Presidential Unit Citation from both the United States and South Korean governments. He retired with he rank of Brigadier General in 1959.
