= Needham Roberts =

American Army soldier

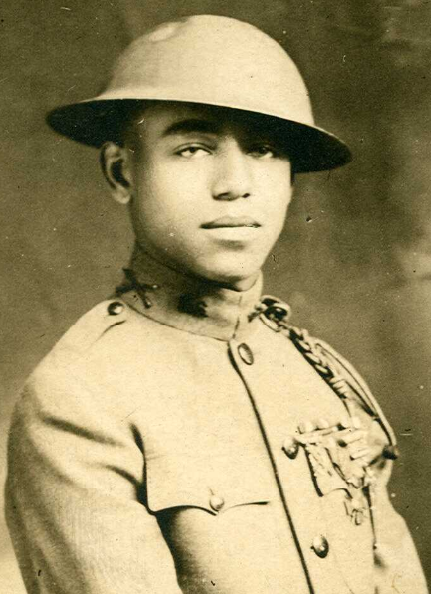
- Roberts as depicted in the May 1919 edition of The Crisis
- Born: April 28, 1901; Trenton, New Jersey, US
- Died: April 18, 1949 (aged 47); Newark, New Jersey, US
- Burial place: Fairmount Cemetery, Newark, New Jersey, US
- Military career
- Allegiance: United States of America
- Branch: United States Army
- Service years: 1917–1919
- Rank: Private
- Unit: New York Army National Guard: 369th Infantry Regiment
- Wars: World War I
- Awards: Purple Heart; Croix de guerre

Needham Roberts (April 28, 1901 – April 18, 1949) was an American soldier in the Harlem Hellfighters and recipient of the Purple Heart and the Croix de Guerre for his valor during World War I.

== Early life ==
Roberts was born in Trenton, New Jersey on April 28, 1901, the son of Emma Roberts and the Reverend Norman Roberts, who had moved to New Jersey from North Carolina in 1890. He sometimes spelled his first name as "Neadom", which is how it appears on his grave marker. Roberts was raised on Trenton's Wilson Street, graduated from Lincoln Elementary School and attended high school, but dropped out before graduating so he could begin working, first as a hotel bellhop, and later as a clerk in a drugstore. At the start of US involvement in World War I in 1917, the sixteen-year-old Roberts lied about his age so he could enlist in the United States Army. He was assigned to the 369th Infantry Regiment, a unit of the 92nd Division.

== World War I ==
While on guard duty on May 14, 1918, Roberts and Private William Henry Johnson fought off a 24-man German patrol, though both were severely wounded. Both were awarded the Croix de Guerre to recognize their heroism. They also received the Purple Heart in 1932; for Johnson, this was a posthumous award. In 2002, Johnson was posthumously awarded the Distinguished Service Cross; in 2015 Johnson's award was upgraded to the Medal of Honor.

== Post-war ==
Roberts was disabled by his wounds, and unable to maintain steady employment. He occasionally gave paid lectures about his wartime experiences, and in the early 1940s gave radio addresses and other speeches as part of the Army's effort to recruit African-Americans for World War II.

== Death and burial ==
Roberts died in Newark, New Jersey on April 18, 1949, and was buried at Fairmount Cemetery in Newark. According to news accounts, Roberts and his wife Iola jointly decided to commit suicide, and hanged themselves in the basement of their home. Newspaper accounts also indicated that they may have been motivated by the fact that he had been accused of molesting a child the day before. In fact, Roberts had previously been arrested on a similar charge; he was acquitted, but his first wife divorced him. Roberts had also been arrested in the 1920s for wearing his Army uniform after the post-war demobilization, something which had also happened to Johnson. As a result of this record, some authors and historians believe it likely that the arrests and criminal charges were motivated by racism rather than actual misconduct.
