= James Waddell (army officer) =

New Zealand soldier

- James Waddell as Foreign Legion lieutenant, prior to World War I
- Born: 11 October 1873; Dunedin, New Zealand
- Died: 18 February 1954 (aged 80); Levin, New Zealand
- Military career
- Allegiance: United Kingdom; France
- Branch: British Army; French Army
- Service years: 1895–1900; 1900–1926
- Rank: Lieutenant colonel
- Unit: Régiment de Marche d'Afrique
- Conflicts: World War I
- Awards: Legion of Honour Croix de guerre 1914–1918

James Waddell (11 October 1873 – 18 February 1954) was one of New Zealand's most highly decorated soldiers of the First World War. Waddell was received in the French Legion of Honour and promoted twice. He was also awarded the French Croix de Guerre seven times during the war.

== Early life ==
Born in Dunedin Waddell attended Otago Boys' High School and then Canterbury College in the evening to prepare for, and win, the first New Zealand government military scholarship. In 1895 he became the first New Zealander to pass the open examination for an officer's commission in the British Army.

== British Army ==
Waddell entered the British Army in 1895 and was commissioned into the 2nd Battalion (Duke of Wellington's) West Riding Regiment. He saw service in Natal and India. During this period, he faced prejudice from his fellow officers in part because of his colonial origins. Other factors reportedly contributing to his ostracism included his small build (5 feet tall) and a university background not shared by his fellow officers. A board of inquiry ordered the retirement of a senior officer involved in the incident.

== French Foreign Legion ==
The regiment was transferred to India, and it was here that Waddell met and married a French woman. She helped him earn the unusual honour for a foreigner, of a direct appointment as an officer in the French Foreign Legion. While the majority of the rank and file of the Legion were non-French, only a small number were able to become officers, and then normally after first reaching the rank of sergeant and becoming naturalised Frenchmen. Waddell resigned his British Army commission, obtained French citizenship and was appointed as a sous-lieutenant (second lieutenant) in the French Army on 25 April 1900. Between 1900 and 1914, Waddell undertook two tours of duty in Indo-China and served in the Sahara, Algeria and Morocco. At the beginning of 1914, he was promoted to the rank of captain with the 1st Foreign Legion Regiment and appointed as a Knight (Chevalier) of the Legion of Honour for his service in Indo-China.

=== Gallipoli ===
Waddell landed at Gallipoli as a captain in the 1er Régiment de Marche d'Afrique in 1915. He soon distinguished himself by his courage and tenacity and received two Croix de Guerre citations on 4 July 1915 and 27 August for bravery in leading his battalion in attacks against Turkish trenches on 21 June and 4 July.

=== Western Front ===
Waddell subsequently served on the Western Front, and was appointed to Officier of the Legion of Honour on 10 June 1917 for his actions during the Battle of the Somme, where his personal example helped carry an attack on the village of Belloy-en-Santerre. It was during this battle that the American poet, Alan Seeger, died. Seeger was a member of Waddell's Battalion. Later, Waddell was in command of the 2nd Battalion of the Régiment de Marche de la Legion etrangere (RMLE) and was involved in the successful capture of Aubervie during the Nivelle Offensive in April 1917. In August 1917, his Battalion played a leading role in the RMLE's assault at Verdun which saw the capture of Cumières-le-Mort-Homme. The RMLE in this action captured some 680 prisoners, eight artillery pieces and numerous machine guns. Some 2.5 km (1.6 mi) of enemy trenches were captured.

After this action, Waddell was transferred to command a training camp involved in training elements of the US 2nd Infantry Division. He was brought back into action to command a battalion of the 169th French Infantry Regiment during the Second Battle of the Marne in 1918. He won a further two Croix de Guerre citations during this battle before being wounded.

By the end of the War, Waddell had been awarded the Croix de Guerre seven times. Described as 'a courageous leader and one of the most respected of all the Legion's officers', Waddell was appointed to Commandeur of the Legion of Honour in 1920. When he retired from the French Army he held the rank of lieutenant colonel.

== Post-war ==
Waddell served in Tunisia until retiring in 1926, remaining on the list of reserve officers until the 1930s. After retirement he remained in North Africa until returning to New Zealand in 1950, following the death of his third wife. He died at Levin in 1954 and is buried in the RSA section of the Levin cemetery.

Note that the "headstone" is a memorial, while the bronze plaque marks the grave in the military service part of the cemetery. While the plaque indicates 5 bronze palms were awarded; the correct number is 7 (thus the Croix de guerre was won seven times at the highest level, that of citation at the army level). He is mentioned prominently in the book "American Fighters in the Foreign Legion, 1914–1918"

Headstone of Lieutenant Colonel James Waddell

== List of honours ==
- Legion of Honour (Commander) (Note: French: Légion d'honneur - Commandeur) (France) – 1920
- Legion of Honour (Officer) (Note: French: Légion d'honneur - Officier) (France) – 10 June 1917
- Legion of Honour (Knight) (Note: French: Légion d'honneur - Chevalier) (France) – 1914
- Croix de guerre 1914–1918 (Palme de bronze - Bronze palm) (France) (five Bronze Palms)
