= Alexander Sachal =

Russian painter

Alexander Povlovic Sachal (November 24, 1924 – March 26, 2020) was an American artist known for his paintings. He was born in Russia, and lived in Sonoma County in Petaluma, California. He died in March 2020 at the age of 95.

== Early life and education ==
Sachal was born in Kiev, Ukraine in November 1924. He moved to Moscow when he was six years old, where his childhood was hard and lonely. He joined the Fine Arts School in Moscow at the age of 16; his drawings and designs were featured on many of Joseph Stalin's posters.

At 17, he joined the Russian Army during World War II, and fought on the North Caucasian Front. He was sent back to Moscow to recover from injuries from an explosion in his machine-gun nest, and later returned to the front line again. Captured by the Germans, he was forced to work in iron-ore mines at Alsace-Lorraine. He escaped the prisoner-of-war camp after a year and a half, in March 1944, and spent four weeks walking to Burgundy, France. However, on arrival, he was imprisoned for vagrancy by French police. Later he joined the French Resistance, under the code name Le Jeune Russe, but was machine-gunned down and severely wounded by Germans. He was rescued and hidden in safety by a French family (JC and MF de Montalembert) until the arrival of the Allied Forces. Sachal received the Croix de Guerre for his bravery.

When the war ended, Sachal moved to Paris, and studied at Académie Julian and Académie de la Grande Chaumière for three years while recovering from his wounds. In 1947 he went to Argentina, but after two years, he returned to Paris and resumed his studies.

== Career ==
In 1955, he moved to northern California, where he worked as a commercial artist. The San Francisco Chronicle called him "The Michelangelo of Highway 101", in reference to the advertisements which he hand-painted on large roadside billboards.

In 1960, he returned to Europe, and lived in Spain for 16 years. The Spanish influence on his art is evident, since his bold and colorful style is reminiscent of Picasso. His work has been exhibited in Paris, London, Germany, Madrid, Málaga, New York and San Francisco.

In 1976, he returned to the United States. He lived in Petaluma, California, with his wife Carol, and continued to work as an artist.

The Pelican Art Gallery has said of Sachal's work

Sachal has a magical style of painting that stands up to the best of history's master artists. Photos just cannot capture the depth of color and sense of emotion. The "Double Portrait" (oil on canvas, 52″ × 42″) ... demonstrates Sachal's ability to capture emotion. When he first showed us this painting he simply said that it showed human tenderness. Sachal has a vivacious love for life and dedication to painting.
