= John B. DeValles =

American priest and US Army chaplain

John B. DeValles (1879–1920) was a Catholic priest who founded the first Portuguese parochial school at Espirito Santo Church in Fall River, Massachusetts, and later served with distinction as a U.S. Army chaplain during World War I. Accounts of his ministry to both Allied and German soldiers were published, and he received honors from both the French and United States government before his death in 1920 of complications from his wartime wounds.

== Early life ==
John B. DeValles was born João Baptista DeValles of Azorean and Cape Verdean parentage in São Miguel, Azores in 1879. Two years later his family emigrated to New Bedford, Massachusetts. John attended local schools, then began studying for the priesthood, where he became known for his language aptitude, including fluency in six languages.

== New Bedford ==
DeValles began his ministry at Our Lady of Mt. Carmel Church in New Bedford, then became pastor at St. John the Baptist Church. DeValles opened the first Portuguese parochial school in the United States at Espirito Santo Church in Fall River.

== Army chaplain ==
As World War I began, DeValles became appointed Knights of Columbus chaplain attached to the 104th Regiment of the 26th Infantry Division. The next year he received a commission as chaplain in the regular U.S. Army with the rank of first lieutenant.

DeValles served 18 months in World War I and often entered No-Man's Land to search for wounded and dying Allied and German soldiers. Father John, as he was known to the troops, risked his life on many occasions and his exploits became legendary. Once, he did not return to the trenches and searchers found him unconscious and wounded next to a dead soldier that he was trying to aid. Although his injuries caused his health to deteriorate, he continued to serve. DeValles returned to the United States in 1919 and spent the remaining months of his life in and out of hospitals until his death in May 1920. He was 41.

== Awards and honors ==
John B. DeValles was awarded France's Croix de Guerre and Legion of Honor as well as the United States Army's Distinguished Service Cross in addition to other awards.

A funeral was held on May 15, 1920, at St. John the Baptist Church which was led by James E. Cassidy. Soldiers, clergy, and citizens attended and General Clarence Ransom Edwards placed the Distinguished Service Cross on DeValles' chest as the medal had not arrived from Washington before his death. Flags were at half-staff and stores closed for half an hour in tribute. Following the ceremony, a military and civil procession escorted his body to the cemetery where he was interred with full military honors.

In October 1920 the Katherine Street School of New Bedford, Massachusetts was renamed in DeValles' honor. The ceremonies were attended by a large cross section of the community. In 2017, the school was rededicated in his honor. The Massachusetts National Guard, a cornerstone of the 26th Division, presented the school with a bronze relief sculpture of DeValles, and the city with the three medals he had been awarded. Members of his family attended the ceremony.

== See also ==
- Roman Catholic Archdiocese for the Military Services, USA#World War II
