= John Beech Austin =

- Born: John Beech Austin; 17 July 1917; Sutton Coldfield, England
- Died: 12 January 2012 (aged 94); Woking, Surrey
- Military career
- Allegiance: United Kingdom
- Branch: Royal Air Force
- Service years: 1939–1945
- Rank: Squadron Leader
- Service number: 104448
- Commands: No 1575 Flight
- Conflicts: World War II
- Awards: Distinguished Flying Cross & Bar; Croix de Guerre; Vlieger Kruis (Dutch Flying Cross); Polish Star

John Beech Austin (17 July 1917 – 12 January 2012) was a British Royal Air Force (RAF) pilot during the Second World War. He was one of the RAF's longest-serving special duties pilots, dropping agents and supplies to Resistance movements in eight countries in occupied Europe.

== Early life ==
Austin was born in Sutton Coldfield, and matriculated from King Edward's School, Birmingham, aged 16 and went to work for the Coventry branch of the Midland Bank as a junior clerk.

== Wartime activities ==
In 1938 he joined the Royal Air Force Volunteer Reserve (RAFVR) in anticipation of war breaking out. He was trained to fly in Tiger Moth biplanes at weekends, was given lectures in theoretical maintenance in weekday evenings, and learned how to navigate using maps on his knees. 'I only did a small amount of flying, but had quite a lot of lectures.'

Two weeks before war broke out, his unit of Volunteer Reserves was disbanded. Its members were called up, and then were sent home to await instructions. After a few days Austin got fed up waiting and went back to work. He spent the autumn of 1939 working at Midland Bank once again.

When Austin was finally called up in 1940 he was sent to train in Cambridge. A number of colleges had been taken over, and drill instruction was given. Vaccinations and inoculations were given to the volunteers. Austin was made a sergeant at Cambridge and was then posted to RAF Filton just north of Bristol, along with the other soldiers whose surnames began with A, B, or C to Training Wing Number 2 EFTS (Elementary Flying Training School) – a grass aerodrome that was – like much of the airforce at that time – short of aircraft.

At RAF Filton training started again from scratch on Tiger Moths, and then from July 1940 the twin engine enclosed-cockpit Oxfords which were alright to fly as long as they didn't stall.

Later in July, Austin went on to the Operational Training Unit Number 10 where he learned to fly Whitley Threes. The aircraft's shortcomings led Austin to force-land on one occasion.

Training complete, he joined 51 Squadron in September 1940 located at RAF Dishforth in Yorkshire, but transferred in March 1941 to No 1419 (Special Duties) Flight (later 138 Squadron).

As a pilot working for the SOE, Austin flew missions to drop agents and supplies for resistance groups against the German occupying forces in Europe. Austin made numerous sorties to France and the Netherlands.

== Operation Bullseye ==
After April 1941 when German forces occupied Yugoslavia in April 1941, the Special Operations Executive (SOE) worked with local partisan groups to combat the Germans. One specific group of interest were the Chetniks commanded by General Mihailovic, and it was decided that air drops would be attempted to supply his forces.

As Yugoslavia was too far Britain, two converted Whitley bombers of No 138 Squadron were sent to Malta to mount Operation Bullseye, one of which Austin piloted.

Austin made the first supply drop leaving Malta on the night of 7 November 1941 accompanied by a Serbian navigator to assist with map reading. He flew up the Adriatic Sea and headed inland across the Yugoslav coast to the drop zone at Mitrovica. After receiving the pre-arranged signal Austin made several circuits to drop his containers before heading back to Malta. A second supply attempt had to be cancelled a month later due to poor weather conditions over the drop zone.

On 3 February 1942 Austin made an 11-hour round trip to drop four agents and eight containers of supplies to Sarajevo. Austin flew at just 700 ft to drop containers and two of the agents before making a second circuit to drop the others. For this flight and the other drops Austin was awarded the Distinguished Flying Cross.

== Later wartime activity ==
Following promotion to squadron leader, Austin took command No 1575 Flight (later No 624 Squadron) in Algeria. His flight supplied partisan groups in Sicily, Italy and Yugoslavia. In January 1944, his squadron moved to Brindisi in southern Italy. Austin continued to fly sorties to supply Tito's partisansgroups in northern Italy.

Austin was rested in March 1944, having added a Bar to his DFC – the citation praised "his exceptional ability and attitude towards operational flying", which had had "an inspiring effect on his squadron". In addition to his British gallantry awards, he received the Croix de Guerre, the Dutch Flying Cross and a Polish decoration.

== Postwar career ==
Austin turned down a move back into banking after being demobilised in November 1945. He subsequently set up a successful timber business in Sussex.

== Awards and decorations ==
- 13 February 1942 – Acting Flying Officer John Beech Austin(104448), Royal Air Force Volunteer Reserve, No. 138 Squadron is awarded the Distinguished Flying Cross:

Pilot Officer Austin has completed many operations, and has displayed a high degree of skill in completing his tasks successfully.

— London Gazette.

- 9 July 1943 – Acting Flying Officer John Beech Austin DFC (104448), Royal Air Force Volunteer Reserve, No. 138 Squadron is awarded a Bar to the Distinguished Flying Cross:

Since the award of the DFC, Flt. Lt. Austin has completed numerous operations. On one occasion, while he was still several hundred miles from base, his aircraft developed trouble with its flaps which caused it to become practically out of control. After a considerable effort, Flt. Lt. Austin was able to regain control, and by his determination and skill he eventually flew back to base. In May, 1943, this officer again returned to this country safely, although his aircraft had been severely damaged by anti-aircraft fire and one engine was not functioning.

— London Gazette.

- 9 October 1945 – Flight Lieutenants. John Beech Austin DFC (104448), Royal Air Force Volunteer Reserve, No. 138 Squadron is awarded the Flying Cross. Conferred by Her Majesty the Queen of the Netherlands.
- Austin also received the Croix de Guerre and a Polish decoration.
