= Ernest Fawcus =

English cricketer

Personal information
- Full name: Ernest Augustus Fawcus
- Born: 10 November 1895; Newcastle-upon-Tyne, Northumberland, England
- Died: 30 June 1966 (aged 70); Halton, Buckinghamshire, England
- Batting: Right-handed
- Bowling: Right-arm (unknown style)

Domestic team information
- Years: Team
- 1927–1929: Royal Air Force
- 1925–1928: Buckinghamshire

Career statistics
Competition	First-class
Matches	5
Runs scored	291
Batting average	41.57
100s/50s	1/1
Top score	115
Balls bowled	453
Wickets	8
Bowling average	25.75
5 wickets in innings	–
10 wickets in match	–
Best bowling	4/51
Catches/stumpings	4/–
- Source: Cricinfo, 1 September 2011

Ernest Augustus Fawcus (10 November 1895 – 30 June 1966) was an English cricketer. Fawcus was a right-handed batsman who bowled with his right-arm, although his bowling style is unknown. He was born at Newcastle-upon-Tyne, Northumberland, and educated at Aldenham School and would later become a British Army and Royal Air Force officer. He died at Halton, Buckinghamshire, on 30 June 1966.

== Military career ==
Fawcus graduated from the Officer Training Corps with the rank of second lieutenant on 26 January 1914, shortly before World War I. He served in the war, initially in the British Army with the Northumberland Fusiliers. By 1917 he was a lieutenant in the Fusiliers, having been promoted to that rank from second lieutenant on 26 May 1915, and was later promoted to captain on 4 January 1917. Later in January 1917, he was seconded for duty in the Royal Flying Corps, which by September 1917 he remained seconded with. By September 1917 he was given the equivalent rank of captain in the Royal Flying Corps, that of flight commander. Fawcus was awarded the Croix de Guerre, which was mentioned in dispatches in the London Gazette in 1918.

On 12 December 1928, Fawcus was promoted from flight lieutenant to squadron leader. On 1 July 1935, Fawcus was promoted from squadron leader to wing commander. On 10 January 1940, he was placed on the retired list of officers. At this time he held the rank of group captain.

== Cricket ==
Fawcus made his debut for Buckinghamshire against the Kent Second XI in 1925. He played Minor counties cricket for Buckinghamshire from 1925 to 1928, making twenty appearances. He made his first-class debut for the Royal Air Force against the Royal Navy in 1927. He made four further first-class appearances for the Royal Air Force, the last of which came against the Royal Navy in 1929. In his five first-class matches, he scored 291 runs at an average of 41.57, with a high score of 115. This score, which was his only first-class century, came against on debut against the Royal Navy in 1927. With the ball, he took 8 wickets at a bowling average of 25.75, with best figures of 4/51.
