= Aram Karamanoukian =

French politician (1910–1996)

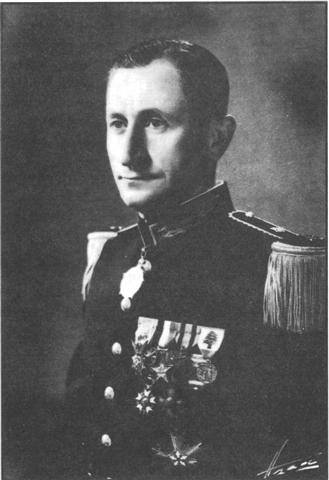
- Native name: Արամ Գարամանուկեան
- Born: 1 May 1910; Aintab, Ottoman Empire
- Died: 23 December 1996 (aged 86) Fort Lee, New Jersey, United States
- Buried: Aleppo, Syria and Yerevan, Armenia
- Allegiance: Syria
- Rank: Lieutenant General
- Conflicts: First Arab-Israeli War
- Awards: Croix de Guerre; Officier de la Légion d'honneur
- Spouse: Hasmig Meghrigian
- Other work: Scholar and member of Syrian parliament

Aram Karamanoukian (Armenian: Արամ Գարամանուկեան; 1 May 1910 – 23 December 1996) was a Syrian-Armenian Lieutenant General of the Syrian Army. He was also a member of the Syrian Parliament. He is the author of several books. For his work as a scholar and military serviceman, Karamanoukian received medals from Egypt, Armenia, Lebanon, Syria, and France.

== Life and career ==
Aram Karamanoukian was born in May 1910 in Aintab (today Gaziantep), Ottoman Empire to his father, Hagop (Effendi) Karamanoukian, a lawyer by profession, and his mother Mariam Leylekian. During the Armenian genocide, the Armenians of Aintab were deported and Karamanoukian, along with his family, were driven into the Syrian Desert where they arrived in Hama and ultimately settled in Aleppo, Ottoman Syria. He received his early education at Atenagan and the Haigazian Lyceum in Aleppo, graduating from there in 1923. Setting aside his education for a few years, he briefly became a dentist in 1924. Thereafter, he resumed his education at the Marist Brothers College in Aleppo.

Thereafter, in 1932, Karamanoukian entered the Syrian Military Academy in Damascus and specialized in artillery. After graduating from the academy in 1934, he was then transferred to France to the School of Applied Artillery where he received additional training from 1938 to 1939. He furthered his education at the École spéciale militaire de Saint-Cyr, graduating from there in 1945 with the rank of officer.

Returning to Syria, Karamanoukian was admitted into the newly formed Syrian Army and was responsible for various positions. He participated in the First Arab-Israeli war at the Quneitra front as the leader of the Syrian artillery regiment. From 1949 to 1957, he became the commander in chief of the Syrian Army's artillery. While serving this post, he was promoted to the rank of lieutenant-general in 1956. He was transferred to Washington D.C. where he served as a military attache to the Syrian embassy. After spending a year abroad, he retired from the military in 1958 and went into public service. In the same year, he married Hasmig Meghrigian, an Armenian American from New York City.

He became a member of parliament in 1961 as an independent representing Aleppo. During his brief political career, he was elected as a member of the National Defense Commission. However, due to growing instability in the country, he retired from the political sphere in 1964 to further his education.

In 1964, Karamanoukian returned to scholarly activity. He attended courses on law at Saint Joseph University in Beirut and graduated with a law degree. He was then accepted into the Sorbonne University in Paris. He continued his PhD studies there and eventually graduated with a LLD degree in 1972. His thesis was on military service and foreigners with a special emphasis on the French Armenian Legion.

He became a United States citizen in 1990. He was then awarded by the New Jersey Association for Lifetime Learning as an Outstanding Adult Learner from Bergen County for the 1989–1990 academic year.

During the Nagorno-Karabakh war, he visited various battlefronts. He was particularly elated about the Armenian victory at the Battle of Kalbajar. In the last months of his life, Karamanoukian toured around the world and visited friends and family in Syria, Armenia, France, and Lebanon. After returning to the United States, he fell gravely ill, and died in Fort Lee, New Jersey on 23 December 1996. In accordance with his will, his remains were transferred to Aleppo and Armenia. In Armenia, part of his remains were buried next to his brother Levon in Yerevan. In Aleppo, the rest of his remains were buried at a local Armenian church. His funeral was attended by many senior officials and dignitaries.

== Decorations ==
Aram Karamanoukian received medals from Egypt, Armenia, Lebanon, Syria, and France. Some of Karamanoukian's awards and decorations include:

- Knights of Cilicia medal (Armenian)
- Nerses Shnorali medal (Armenian)
- Croix de Guerre (French)
- Officier de la Légion d'honneur (French)
- Order of Merit (Lebanese)
- Palestinian War Medal (Syrian)
- Order of Civil Merit (Syrian)
- Order of Military Merit (Syrian)

== Scholarly works ==
- La double nationalité et le service militaire (1974)
- Les étrangers et le service militaire (1978)

=== Books about Karamanoukian ===
- Zōravar Garamanukeani keankʻn u gortsĕ by Hasmik Garamanukean (in Armenian)
