= Palmer O. Narveson =

Pastor, American Srgt., and Croix de Guerre Recipient (1896–1893)

Personal details
- Born: Palmer Orven Narveson; March 23, 1896 Freeborn County, Minnesota, United States
- Died: August 3, 1983 (aged 90) Laguna Hills, California, United States
- Spouse: Lillian Caroline Soldan
- Children: 2
- Awards: Croix de Guerre; Distinguished Service Cross

Military service
- Allegiance: United States
- Branch/service: United States Army
- Rank: Sergeant
- Unit: Infantry Branch
- Battles/wars: World War I

Palmer Orven Narveson (March 25, 1893 – August 3, 1983) was an American advertiser and decorated WWI veteran.

== Early life and education ==
Palmer Orven Narveson was born on March 25, 1896, in Nunda Township, Freeborn County, Minnesota. He was the son of Samuel O. Narveson, who was 29 at the time of his birth, and Gunda Amalia Oppegaard, who was 22.

He was educated at the University of Minnesota. He worked as a special reporter for the university's official newspaper, the Minnesota Daily and his work was selected for publication in the first issue of The Work Shop Paper, a journalism department trade periodical sponsored by the department head, R. R. Barlow.

== Wartime service ==
Palmer Narveson served as a Sergeant in the United States Army during the First World War. He was assigned to Company H of the 119th Infantry Regiment, 30th Division of the American Expeditionary Forces. On September 29, 1918, near Bellicourt, France, Narveson and two other soldiers became separated from their company and were fired upon from three directions. He single-handedly attacked and destroyed a machine-gun nest and neutralized a second hostile position. Although wounded and slightly gassed, he refused to be evacuated and continued the advance with his unit. For these actions, he was awarded the Distinguished Service Cross by the President of the United States, as well as the French Croix de Guerre. Following the Minneapolice Armistce Day parade, French General L. Collardet, special representative of Marshal Foch, assisted by American Army Col. Gordon Johnston (soldier), pinned the Croix de Guerre on Sergeant Narveson.

=== Medals awarded to Sgt. Narveson ===
- Distinguished Service Cross (Army)
- Croix de guerre 1914–1918 (for World War I service)

== Later life and family ==
Following his military service, Narveson moved to California, residing in Beverly Hills in 1930 and living in the Los Angeles area for approximately ten years. He established a career running an associated advertising business in the state.

Narveson married Lillian Caroline Soldan. Together, they had a daughter named Mary Lou, a son named Richard S., and six grandchildren.

Palmer died on August 3, 1983, at the age of 87 in Orange County, California. He was survived by his children, wife, grandchildren, his sister Myrtle, and his brother B.H. Narveson. Funeral services were held at the Lutheran Church of the Cross in Laguna Hills, and he was buried at El Toro Memorial Park in Lake Forest, California.
