= Collette Nirouet =

- Born: 1926
- Died: 12 November 1944 (aged c. 18); Alsace
- Other name: Evelyne Meunier
- Occupation: French army combatant

Collette Nirouet (1926 – 12 November 1944) was a Parisian fighter against the German army forces in World War II. She fought and died in Alsace having joined the 6th company of the Auvergne Regiment of the French First Army. For her heroism, she was awarded the French War Cross (Croix de Guerre) on 30 August 1985.

== Biography ==
Nirouet's father was a genealogist who had fought for France during World War I, service that earned him the Croix de Guerre. When German troops advanced on France in 1940, Collette's brother, who was permanently injured after a bicycle accident, was unable to enlist.

=== Military service ===
Assuming the name Evelyne Meunier, Collette joined the French First Army on 15 October 1944 at the age of 18 as a nurse even though no evidence has been found that she had medical training. According to Whaley, she may have been inspired to join the army because of "her experiences at her grandmother’s home in Pont-de-Pany that served as a refuge for Allied soldiers. Nirouet not only witnessed the crash of an RAF plane, but also helped provide medical aid for the injured pilot."

Soon after joining the army, she convinced her regiment's captain to allow her to fight as a soldier, and for the next few months she fought alongside male members of her company for both offensive and defensive actions along the forests of Oberwald. She quickly gained the affectionate nickname Joan of Arc from her compatriots during her service.

Nirouet was mortally wounded in action in Alsace on 12 November 1944 during the battle of Oberwald, however her remains were never recovered. It is believed that the retreating German soldiers took her corpse along with their wounded as they departed the battlefield. Because she had been using the name of Evelyne Meunier, her real name (Nirouet) did not appear on the list of those killed in that battle. However, the name of Meunier does appear, in error, on the list of those killed on 26 November 1944 in the Journal des Marches of the 152nd Regiment Infanterie, Campaign 1944–1945.

=== Belated recognition ===
Nirouet was awarded the Croix de Guerre on 30 August 1985 because of the initiative taken by a fellow combatant, Antonin Cubizolles, a veteran from World War II. On 23 February 1984, he began a personal quest to recognize Nirouet's service and undertook the long and complicated process of piecing together evidence of her life and military service. To do so Cubizolles contacted numerous fellow comrades-in-arms who knew her personally and who helped him in his mission. In 1985, their combined efforts culminated in the award and appropriate recognition.

== External sources ==
- Cubizolles, Antonin. Évelyne: Ou L'étrange disparue des combats de l'Oberwald. Récit historique. FeniXX, 1987. (in French)
- Gildea, Robert. "Les Inconnus de la resistance: letters to L’Humanité, 1984". Essays in French Literature and Culture 54 (2017).
