= Harry Cator =

Recipient of the Victoria Cross (1894–1966)

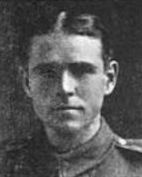
- Born: 24 January 1894; Drayton, Norfolk, England
- Died: 7 April 1966 (aged 72); Norwich, England
- Burial place: Sprowston Cemetery
- Military career
- Allegiance: United Kingdom
- Branch: British Army
- Service years: 1914–1947
- Rank: Captain
- Units: East Surrey Regiment; Home Guard
- Conflicts: World War I World War II
- Awards: Victoria Cross; Military Medal; Croix de Guerre (France)

Harry Cator VC, MM (24 January 1894 – 7 April 1966) was an English recipient of the Victoria Cross, the highest and most prestigious award for gallantry in the face of the enemy that can be awarded to British and Commonwealth forces.

== Biography ==
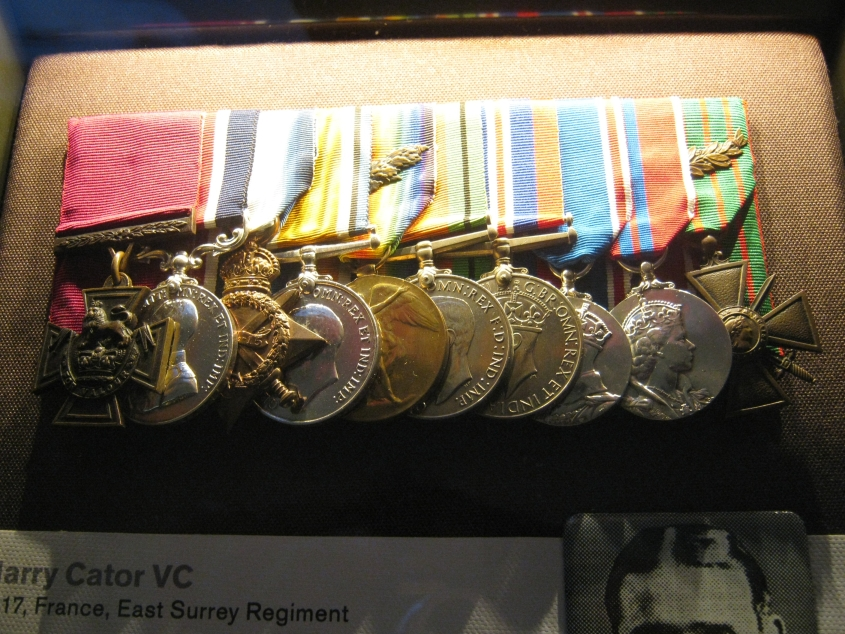
Cator's medals on display at the Ashcroft Gallery, Imperial War Museum

Cator was born in Drayton, Norfolk, to railway worker Robert Cator, and his wife Laura. After leaving school, he was a porter on the London Midland and Great Northern Joint Line before joining a building contractor in Great Yarmouth.

He joined the British Army in September 1914 and arrived on the Western Front in June 1915 already a sergeant in the 7th (Service) Battalion, East Surrey Regiment. In 1916 at the time of the Battle of the Somme, he was awarded the Military Medal for bringing back 36 wounded men from No man's land.

He was awarded the Victoria Cross for his actions during the Arras offensive. On 9 April 1917 near Arras, Sergeant Cator's platoon had suffered heavy casualties from a hostile machine gun. Under heavy fire the sergeant, with one man, advanced across the open to attack the gun and when his companion was killed, he went on alone. Picking up a Lewis gun and some ammunition drums on his way, he succeeded in reaching the enemy trench and sighting another hostile machine gun, he killed the entire team and the officer. He held the end of the trench with such effect that a bombing squad were able to capture 100 prisoners and five machine guns.

A few days later he was injured by an exploding shell. It was shortly after that the award of the VC and the French Croix de Guerre were announced. After the war he worked as a postman and as a civil servant.

Cator served with the rank of captain in the Home Guard during the Second World War, and was commandant of a prisoner-of-war camp near Cranwick. He retired from the Army in December 1947.

He died of pneumonia in Norwich on 7 April 1966 and is buried in Sprowston cemetery.

His VC and other medals are displayed in the Lord Ashcroft Gallery at the Imperial War Museum.
