= John McNulty (U.S. Marine Corps) =

Maj. John McNulty of Revere, Massachusetts (fl. c. 1918), American Expeditionary Forces, was a U.S. Marine Corps World War I war hero. For his service in that conflict, then, 1st Sgt. McNulty was awarded the Navy Cross (for "Extraordinary heroism in combat not justifying the Medal of Honor"), the Distinguished Service Cross (United States) (for "Distinguishes himself by extraordinary heroism not justifying the Medal of Honor") and, twice, the Silver Star (for "gallantry in action against an enemy of the United States").

== Navy Cross ==
McNulty's most significant act of valor occurred in action between Blanc Mont and St. Etienne, France, on October 4, 1918, while he was a gunnery sergeant. With the crew of his machine gun all killed or wounded about him and while himself under heavy artillery and machine gun fire and severely, near mortally, wounded, Gunnery McNulty voluntarily stood his Vickers gun against Central Powers forces until they were repulsed. Not relinquishing his post even after the enemy retired, McNulty had to be then actually ordered off the field and to the rear for surgical treatment by his commanding officer.

== Rise through the ranks to commissioned officer ==
McNulty was also promoted from 1st Sgt. to Marine Gunner for his heroism at Blanc Mont. He was commissioned a 2nd Lieutenant in 1921 and retired from the U.S. Marine Corps in 1940 at the rank of major, having served a total 40 years with the Corps.

== Medals and decorations ==
Here are some of the medals and decorations awarded 1st Sgt. McNulty:

- Navy Cross
- Distinguished Service Cross (Army) (also awarded to U.S. Marines)
- Silver Star with one oak leaf cluster.
- Marine Corps Expeditionary Medal
- World War I Victory Medal
