= Edward Terence Donnelly =

U.S. Army officer

Edward T. Donnelly
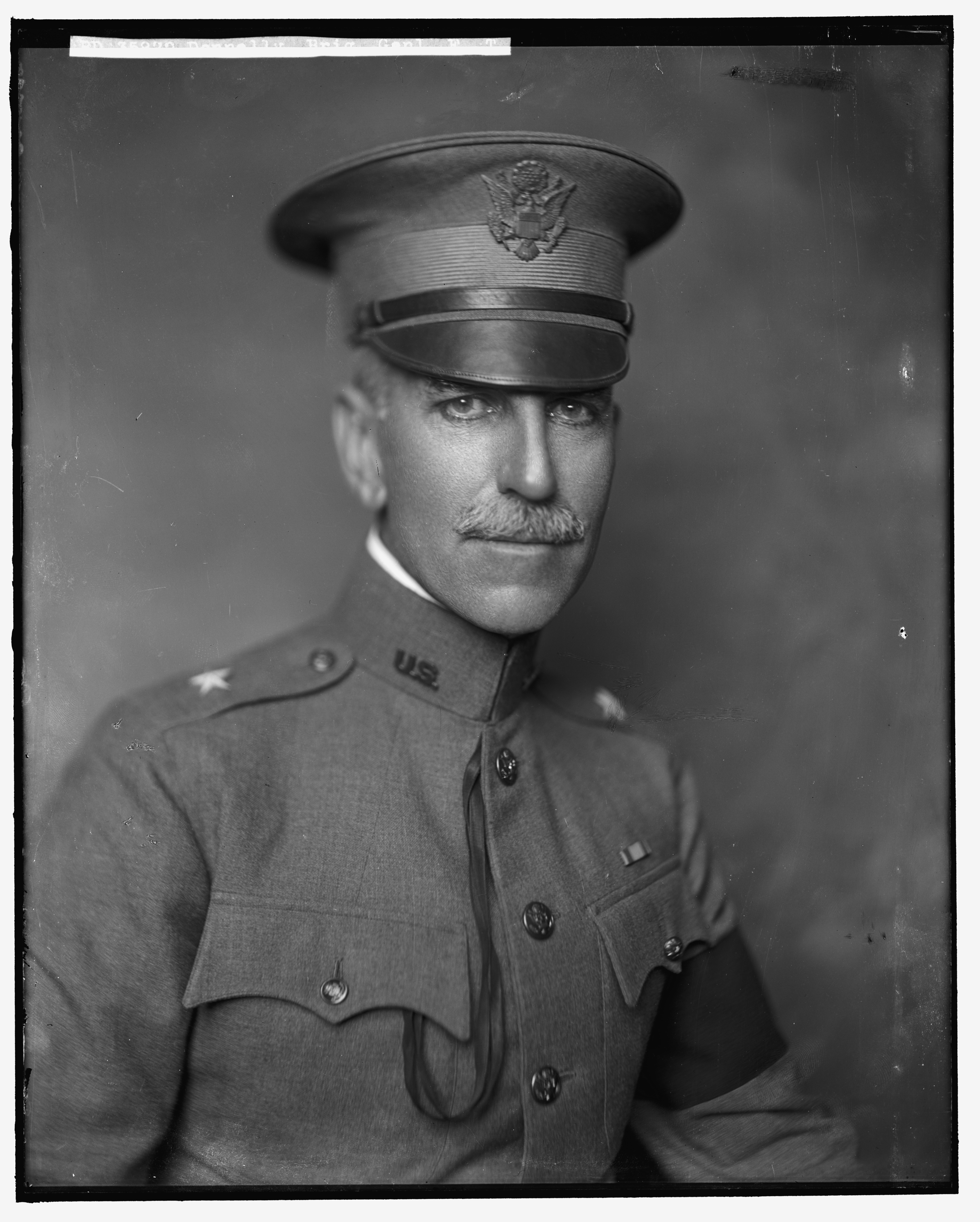
- Edward T. Donnelly as brigadier general
- Born: August 22, 1871; London, England
- Died: February 8, 1929 (aged 57)
- Spouse: Flora Fitten Berwick
- Military career
- Allegiance: United States
- Branch: United States Army
- Service years: 1898–1929
- Rank: Brigadier general
- Service number: 0-911
- Conflicts: Spanish–American War; Philippine–American War; Pancho Villa Expedition; World War I
- Awards: Croix de Guerre

Edward Terence Donnelly (August 22, 1871 – February 8, 1929) was a United States Army officer in the late 19th and early 20th centuries.

== Biography ==
Donnelly was born in London on August 22, 1871, the son of Edward C. Donnelly who was from New York City. He attended Manhattan College, Columbia University, and New York Law School, receiving his Bachelor of Laws from the latter.

Donnelly was commissioned as a captain in the Eighth New York Infantry on May 17, 1898. After being honorably mustered out of the volunteer service on November 3, 1898, Donnelly was commissioned as a first lieutenant in the 43rd U.S. Volunteer Infantry on August 17, 1899, though he was honorably mustered out on July 5, 1901. On August 1, 1901, Donnelly was commissioned again as a first lieutenant for artillery.

Donnelly graduated from the School of Application for Cavalry and Field Artillery in 1905. On January 25, 1907, he was promoted to the rank of Captain, and on June 6 of that year he was transferred to the First Field Artillery. Donnelly later served on the Sixth, Third, and Fifth Field Artillery regiments, and he participated in the Spanish–American War, Philippine–American War, and the Pancho Villa Expedition. He rose through the ranks until his promotion to the rank of brigadier general on April 12, 1918.

Donnelly served in France during World War I, serving from July 1918 to May 1919 as the commanding general of the 164th Field Artillery Brigade of the 89th Infantry Division. He was awarded the Croix de Guerre.

Donnelly died on February 8, 1929.

== Bibliography ==
- Davis, Henry Blaine Jr. (1998). Generals in Khaki. Raleigh, North Carolina: Pentland Press. ISBN 1571970886. OCLC 40298151.
- Marquis Who's Who (1975). Who Was Who In American History – The Military. Chicago, Illinois: Marquis Who's Who. ISBN 0837932017.

== Personal life ==
Donnelly married Flora Fitten Berwick on November 22, 1909. He was a Roman Catholic.
