= Paul de Montgolfier =

Paul-Joseph de Montgolfier (28 April 1913 – 8 November 1942) was a French fighter pilot druring the Second World War. He was flying Curtiss 75 Hawks with the GC II/5 fighter group when World War II began.

De Montgolfier was born in Saint-Marcel-d'Ardèche, France. On 6 November 1939, Paul de Montgolfier and 8 other pilots were escorting bombers over the Sarre region when they were jumped by 27 Messerschmitt fighters of JGr 102. The French pilots scored 5 victories (and another 5 probable victories, including one shot down by Montgolfier) for the loss of only two of their own. This fight - known as the "9 against 27" fight was to become legendary and Hannes Gentzen, the CO of JGr 102, was summoned back to Berlin and threatened with court-martial for such disastrous results.

Montgolfier went on top score more victories until the Nazi invasion of France : he was shot down on 15 May 1940 and wounded. He was credited with 5 aerial victories.

After recovering, he went back to active service and was shot down and killed in action fighting the Allied landing at Casablanca on 8 November 1942.

== List of aerial victories ==
1. Bf 109; 06 November 39 - Probable, shared with Lt Trémolet
2. He 111; 23 November 39 - Destroyed, shared with Sgt Audrain, Sgt Bouhy and 3 RAF pilots. Over Boulay.
3. Do 17; 02 March 40 - Probable, shared with A/C Gras, S/C Janebas
4. Bf 109; 10 May 40 - Destroyed over Luxemburg.
5. ??

== Awards ==
- Légion d'Honneur
- Médaille Militaire
- Croix de Guerre avec palme
