= Maurice Bambier =

Maurice Bambier (27 December 1925, Montataire – 2 March 1994, Senlis) was a French politician. A steelworker by trade, Bambier was a member of the administrative committee for the General Confederation of Labour of Oise from 1956 to 1963, Federal Secretary for the Communist Party from 1965 to 1983, and mayor of Montataire from 1983 to 1994.

== Early years ==
Born into a working-class family of nine children, Bambier worked from the age of 14 at the Brissonneau and Lotz factory in Creil and the Desnoyers factory in Laigneville, where he remained for 22 years. In 1943 Bambier became a part of the resistance movement when he joined the Mouvement Jeunes Communistes de France. During this time he enlisted in the army and participated in battles around Dunkirk in 1944 and 1945, for which he was awarded the Croix de guerre.

== Political career ==
After the liberation Bambier became the head of the General Confederation of Labour for Creil. In 1951 he entered the federal secretariat of the French Communist Party (PCF) where he became the first secretary for Oise from 1965 - 1983. Bambier represented the PCF at each general election in the fourth district of Oise from 1956 until his death.

From 1953 on Bambier was also the PCF candidate for the Creil mayoral elections, but was systematically beaten by the socialist candidates. In 1977 he became associated with the Union of the Socialist Left. In 1983 Bambier left the PCF and was elected mayor of Montataire, a position he held until his death.

== Personal life ==
Bambier was married and a father of five. He died in the hospital in Senlis on 2 March 1994.

== Sources ==
- Dictionnaire biographique, mouvement ouvrier, mouvement social. Tome 1, Période 1940-1968 de la Seconde Guerre mondiale à mai 1968, A à Bek, Paris, Atelier edition, 2006 ISBN 2-7082-3825-6
- Raymond Lavigne, Montataire debout depuis les Jacques, Paris, Messidor, 1990
