= Robert Sink =

United States Army general (1905–1965)

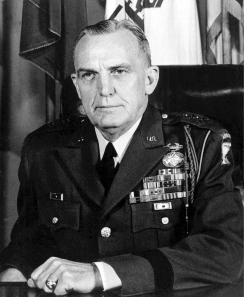
- Born: 3 April 1905; Lexington, North Carolina, U.S.
- Died: 13 December 1965 (aged 60); Fort Bragg, North Carolina, U.S.
- Burial place: Arlington National Cemetery
- Alma mater: United States Military Academy
- Spouses: Margaret Coe (m. 1932; died 1963); Grace Cannon (m. 1964)
- Children: 5
- Military career
- Allegiance: United States
- Branch: United States Army
- Service years: 1927–1961
- Rank: Lieutenant general
- Nickname: "Bourbon Bob"
- Commands: United States Caribbean Command; Strategic Army Corps; XVIII Airborne Corps; 44th Infantry Division; 7th Armored Division; 506th Parachute Infantry Regiment; 503rd Parachute Infantry Battalion
- Conflicts: World War II; Battle of Normandy; Operation Market Garden; Battle of the Bulge; Western Allied invasion of Germany; Korean War
- Awards: Silver Star (3); Legion of Merit (2); Bronze Star (2)

Robert Frederick Sink (3 April 1905 – 13 December 1965) was an American soldier who served as an officer in the United States Army from 1927 to 1961. His most notable command was of the 506th Parachute Infantry Regiment of the 101st Airborne Division during World War II, which fought in Operation Overlord, Operation Market Garden, and the Western Allied invasion of Germany. He also served as an assistant division commander during the Korean War, and held an array of high-ranking staff positions until his retirement as a lieutenant general.

== Early life and education ==
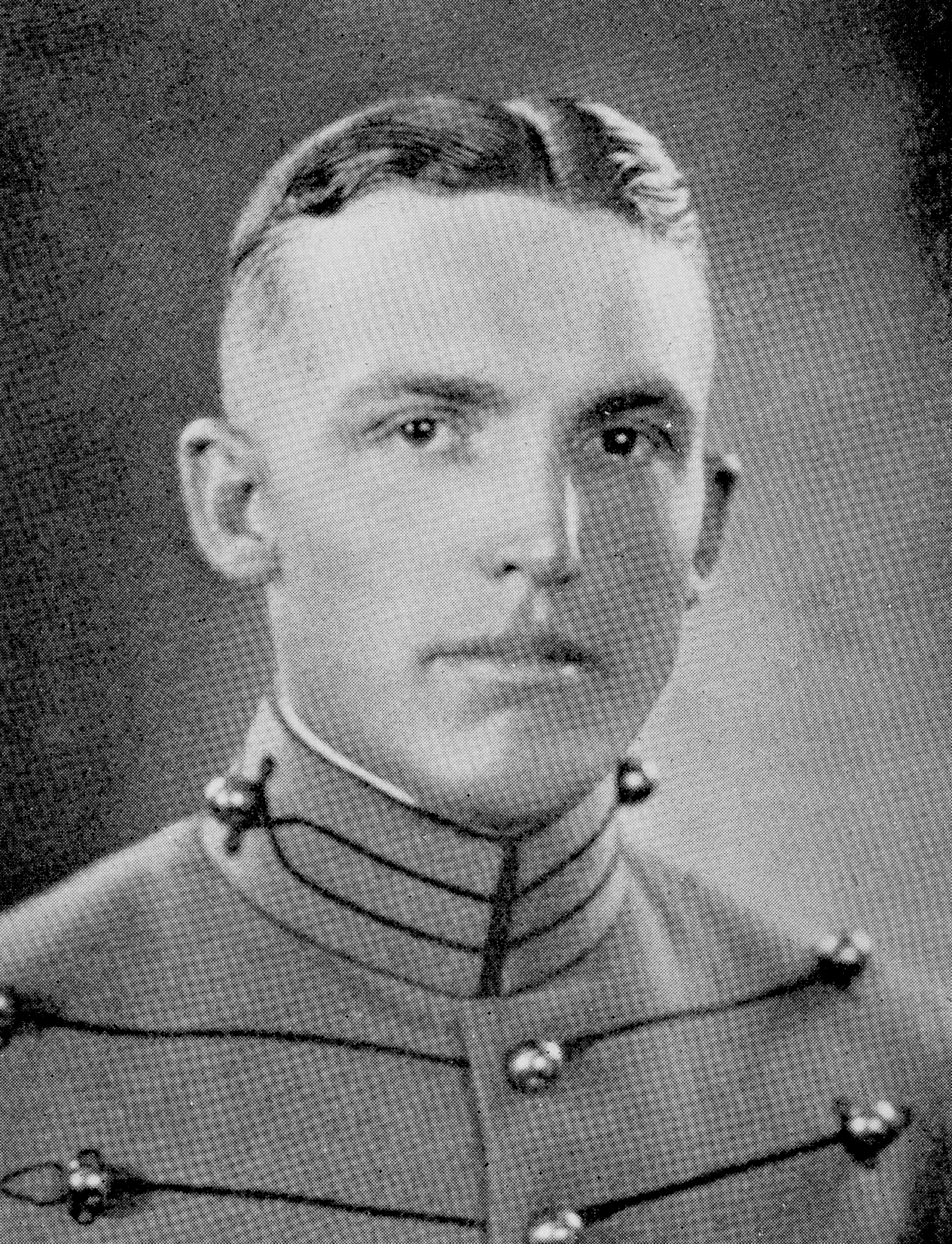
Sink as a West Point cadet in 1927

Sink was born in Lexington, North Carolina, to Frederick Obediah and Mary Wilson (Cecil) Sink. Frederick was the owner and publisher of The Dispatch newspaper in Lexington. Sink entered Trinity College (now Duke University) in 1922 before being appointed to the United States Military Academy at West Point in 1923. He graduated with a Bachelor of Science degree in 1927, ranking 174th out of 203 cadets.

== Career ==
=== Early career ===
After graduation from West Point, Sink was commissioned as a second lieutenant and assigned to the 8th Infantry Regiment at Fort Screven, Georgia. Between 1929 and 1933, Sink was assigned to Puerto Rico (with the 65th Infantry Regiment), the Army Chemical Warfare School, Fort Meade, the 34th Infantry Regiment, and the Civilian Conservation Corps at McAlevys Fort, Pennsylvania. In 1935, he trained at the United States Army Infantry School at Fort Benning, Georgia. In November 1937, after assignment to the 57th Infantry Regiment at Fort William McKinley in the Philippines, Captain Sink returned to the United States and was assigned to the 25th Infantry Regiment at Fort Huachuca, Arizona, where he served as a company commander and then as regimental operations officer.

=== World War II ===
In 1940, Sink joined the Army's fledgling paratrooper force and was assigned to the 501st Parachute Infantry Battalion at Fort Benning. Sink subsequently commanded the 503rd Parachute Infantry Battalion before assuming command of the 506th Parachute Infantry Regiment at Camp Toccoa, Georgia, in July 1942. Sink was responsible for building the regiment's officer corps as well as the camp's obstacle courses. In December 1942, Sink read in Reader's Digest about a Japanese army battalion that marched 100 miles (160 km) in 70 hours. Not to be outdone, he ordered the 2nd Battalion of the 506th to march from Camp Toccoa to Atlanta, covering 118 miles in 75 hours. The regiment was attached to the 101st Airborne Division on 1 June 1943 and arrived in England in September and was billeted in the Wiltshire villages of Aldbourne, Chilton Foliat, Froxfield, and Ramsbury.

On D-Day, Sink parachuted into Normandy from the lead plane of the 439th Troop Carrier Group. He commanded the 506th until the final month of World War II, leading it through engagements on D-Day, the Battle of Normandy, Operation Market Garden, the Battle of the Bulge (including the Siege of Bastogne), and the invasion and occupation of Germany. The regiment was sometimes called the "Five-Oh-Sink" after its leader. Sink's drinking earned him the nickname "Bourbon Bob", but Major Richard Winters said he believed it did not affect his leadership.

=== Later career ===
On 12 August 1945, Sink was named assistant division commander of the 101st Airborne Division. In January 1946, he assumed command of the infantry detachment of the United States Military Academy. He graduated from the National War College in June 1949, and was transferred to the Ryukyus Command in Japan, becoming chief of staff in October 1949. In January 1951, he was promoted to brigadier general and named assistant division commander of the 7th Infantry Division during the Korean War.

In December 1951, Sink became assistant division commander of the 11th Airborne Division at Fort Campbell, Kentucky. In February 1953, he assumed command of the 7th Armored Division at Camp Roberts, California. In November 1953, Major General Sink became commanding general of the 44th Infantry Division at Fort Lewis, Washington. In October 1954, he was assigned to the Joint Airborne Troop Board at Fort Bragg, North Carolina. In early 1955, he was transferred to Rio de Janeiro, Brazil, and in April 1955 assumed the dual functions of chairman of the United States Delegation to the Joint Brazil–United States Military Commission and chief of army section, Military Assistance Advisory Group, Brazil.

Sink assumed command of the XVIII Airborne Corps and Fort Bragg in May 1957. In May 1958, he was appointed commander of Strategic Army Corps (STRAC). His final assignment was as the commander of U.S. forces in Panama. Sink retired at the rank of lieutenant general in 1961 due to declining health.

== Personal life and death ==
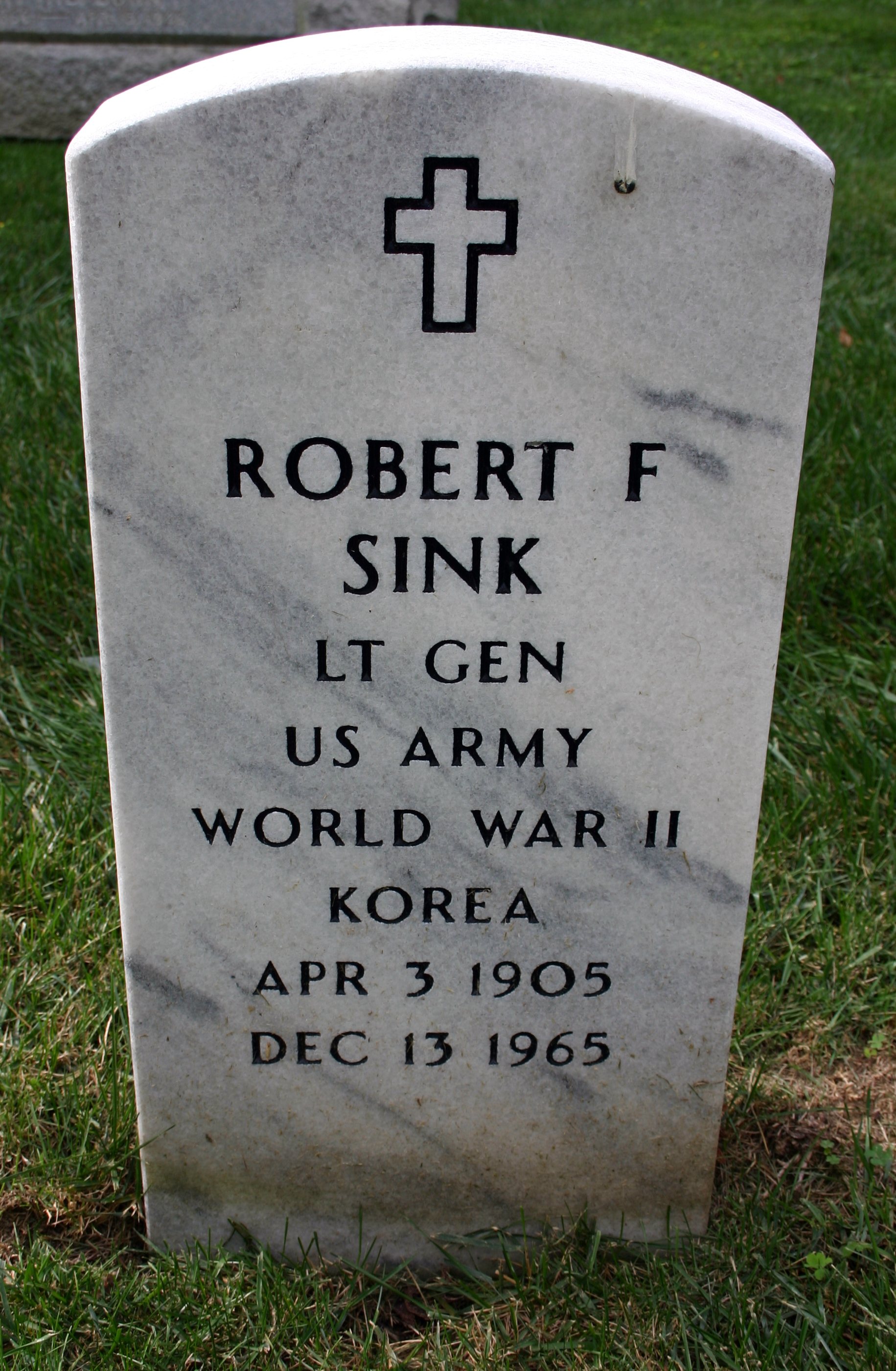
Sink's headstone at Arlington National Cemetery

Sink married Margaret Elizabeth Coe in 1932. They had three children together before Margaret died in 1963. In 1964, Sink married Grace (Gall) Cannon and became step-father to her two children.

Sink died of pulmonary emphysema at Fort Bragg, North Carolina, on 13 December 1965, at the age of 60. He was interred at Arlington National Cemetery.

== Legacy ==
General Maxwell D. Taylor, commander of the 101st Airborne Division, said of Sink: "He was among the bravest, most able men I knew—exposed himself to enemy fire more than anyone in the division." Taylor said with regret that Sink deserved a wartime promotion, but the promotion of Gerald J. Higgins to brigadier general as Taylor's assistant division commander after the death of Don Pratt prevented any further promotions of colonels in the 101st.

In his memoir Beyond Band of Brothers, Richard Winters wrote of his former commanding officer:

In short, Bob Sink was an extraordinarily talented officer who was the heart and soul of the 506th. He did things with a personal flair, and his southern drawl was full of home-spun sayings that endeared him to the regiment he led so gallantly beginning in July 1942. He always talked to his soldiers on a man-to-man basis. He gave us all a sense of "we." The 506th PIR was going to fight the war together, not as a series of independent battalions. To have been a member of the "Five-Oh-Sink" had been a badge of honor...How Colonel Sink welded a disparate group of citizen soldiers into a first-class fighting unit is a topic that merits a book of its own. The army had given him kids fresh off the streets. Many were undernourished and poorly educated...This was the kind of officer Sink was assigned and told to turn the group into a crack airborne unit. Colonel Sink straightened us out. He was the one who put it all together...In my opinion, our regimental commander was one of the finest West Point officers of the war.

In the 1977 film A Bridge Too Far, Robert Stout, the commander of the 506th PIR played by Elliott Gould, is based on Sink. Sink is also featured prominently in the 2001 HBO miniseries Band of Brothers, where he is played by Dale Dye.

== Awards and decorations ==
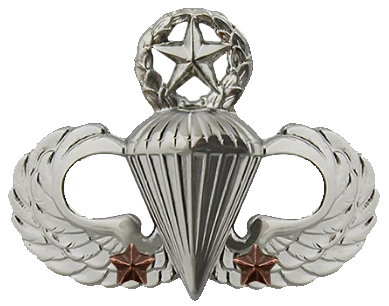

Badge	Master Parachutist Badge with two combat jump stars		
Badge	Combat Infantryman Badge		
1st row	Silver Star with two oak leaf clusters	Legion of Merit with oak leaf cluster	Bronze Star Medal with oak leaf cluster
2nd row	Air Medal with oak leaf cluster	American Defense Service Medal	American Campaign Medal
3rd row	European-African-Middle Eastern Campaign Medal with 3 service stars and arrowhead device	World War II Victory Medal	Army of Occupation Medal with Germany and Japan clasps
4th row	National Defense Service Medal	Korean Service Medal	United Nations Korea Medal
5th row	Distinguished Service Order (Britain)	Croix de Guerre with Palm (Belgium)	Croix de Guerre with bronze Palm (France)
6th row	Order of Leopold, Officer with Palm (Belgium)	Bronze Lion (The Netherlands)	Korean War Service Medal (South Korea)
Unit awards	Presidential Unit Citation with oak leaf cluster		Presidential Unit Citation (South Korea)

== Dates of rank ==
Insignia	Rank	Component	Date
	Second lieutenant	Regular Army	1927
	First lieutenant	Regular Army	1933
	Captain	Regular Army	1937
	Major	Army of the United States	1941
	Lieutenant colonel	Army of the United States	1942
	Colonel	Army of the United States	1942
	Brigadier general	Army of the United States	1951
	Major general	Army of the United States	1954
	Lieutenant general	Army of the United States	1959

Military offices
Preceded by Ridgely Gaither	Commander-in-Chief, United States Caribbean Command; 1958–1960	Succeeded by Andrew P. O'Meara
Preceded by Clark L. Ruffner	Commanding General, Third United States Army; 1960	Succeeded by Herbert B. Powell
