= Joe Hooper =

Joseph or Joe Hooper may refer to:

- Joe Hooper (Medal of Honor) (1938–1979), recipient of the Medal of Honor
- Sir Leonard Hooper (1914–1994), Director, Government Communications Headquarters, 1965–1973, and Government Intelligence Co-ordinator, 1973–1978
- Joseph L. Hooper (1877–1934), politician
