= Howard R. Johnson =

United States Army officer (1903–1944)

Howard Ravenscroft Johnson
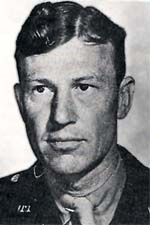
- Colonel Howard Johnson
- Born: June 18, 1903; Maryland, United States
- Died: October 8, 1944 (aged 41); Heteren, the Netherlands
- Burial place: Arlington National Cemetery
- Military career
- Allegiance: United States of America
- Branch: United States Army
- Service years: 1923–1944
- Rank: Colonel
- Nicknames: Skeets, Jumpy
- Commands: 501st Parachute Infantry Regiment
- Conflicts: World War II

Howard Ravenscroft Johnson (June 18, 1903 – October 8, 1944) was an officer of the United States Army. He was the commander of the 501st Parachute Infantry Regiment during World War II.

== Early career ==
Howard Ravenscroft Johnson was born on June 18, 1903, in Maryland. His father was a shipbuilder in that state. Graduating from Central High School in Washington, D.C., Johnson attended the U.S. Naval Academy in Annapolis matriculating with the classes of 1926 and 1927. After two years he left the academy, and went to Texas, where he tried to become a pilot in the Army Air Corps. The instructors sent him away because of poor "side vision." Johnson stayed in the Army, however, and was stationed in the Panama Canal Zone, Fort Sill, Oklahoma and in China, before returning to his home state of Maryland, where he would be posted at Fort Meade. Before World War II broke out, Johnson, by then advancing in rank, was driving a jeep when it flipped over, severely injuring him. After he eventually recovered, his commanders offered him the chance to command the First Special Service Force, known as the "Black Devils." Johnson didn't think that it would ever be an effective fighting force. The unit went on to fight in World War II under command of Robert T. Frederick, earning recognition for its nighttime raids behind the German lines at Anzio Beach. Soon, his superiors gave him the opportunity to command another combat unit, the 501st Parachute Infantry Regiment (501st PIR).

Johnson attended the Naval Academy for two years; he boxed while a midshipman. He had transferred to the Army after leaving Annapolis and had most recently been at the tank destroyer center before volunteering for parachute duty. His nickname among his men became "Jumping Johnson." He was a zealot on physical conditioning, for himself and everyone in his regiment, and personally led calisthenics, running and all other physical activities. He set a record for running up Currahee Mountain (which loomed over Camp Toccoa) and challenged anyone in the regiment to beat his time. A heavy punching bag hung outside his quarters, and when not punching that, Johnson could often be seen throwing his huge knife at hanging plywood replicas of Hitler and Hirohito.

== Commanding the 501st and D-Day ==
After the regiment endured rigorous training at Camp Toccoa and Fort Benning, Georgia, it was sent to North Carolina for military maneuvers. In January 1944, Johnson and the 501st PIR sailed to England. By now, "Jumpy" Johnson had instilled a positive attitude in them which led to a fighting spirit. On D-Day, the 501st, now permanently attached to the 101st Airborne Division was assigned to seize some canal locks and demolish the bridges over the Douve River. One battalion remained in the 101st Division reserve. When the men of the regiment parachuted into Normandy, they were widely scattered. Johnson gathered a group of his men and as platoons and companies in the regiment got back together, they annihilated a battalion of German paratroopers guarding the canal locks. The 101st Division became the First Army reserve in July 1944, so after a month of fighting, the 501st PIR was able to rest. For his actions in Normandy, Johnson was awarded the Distinguished Service Cross.

== Operation Market Garden ==
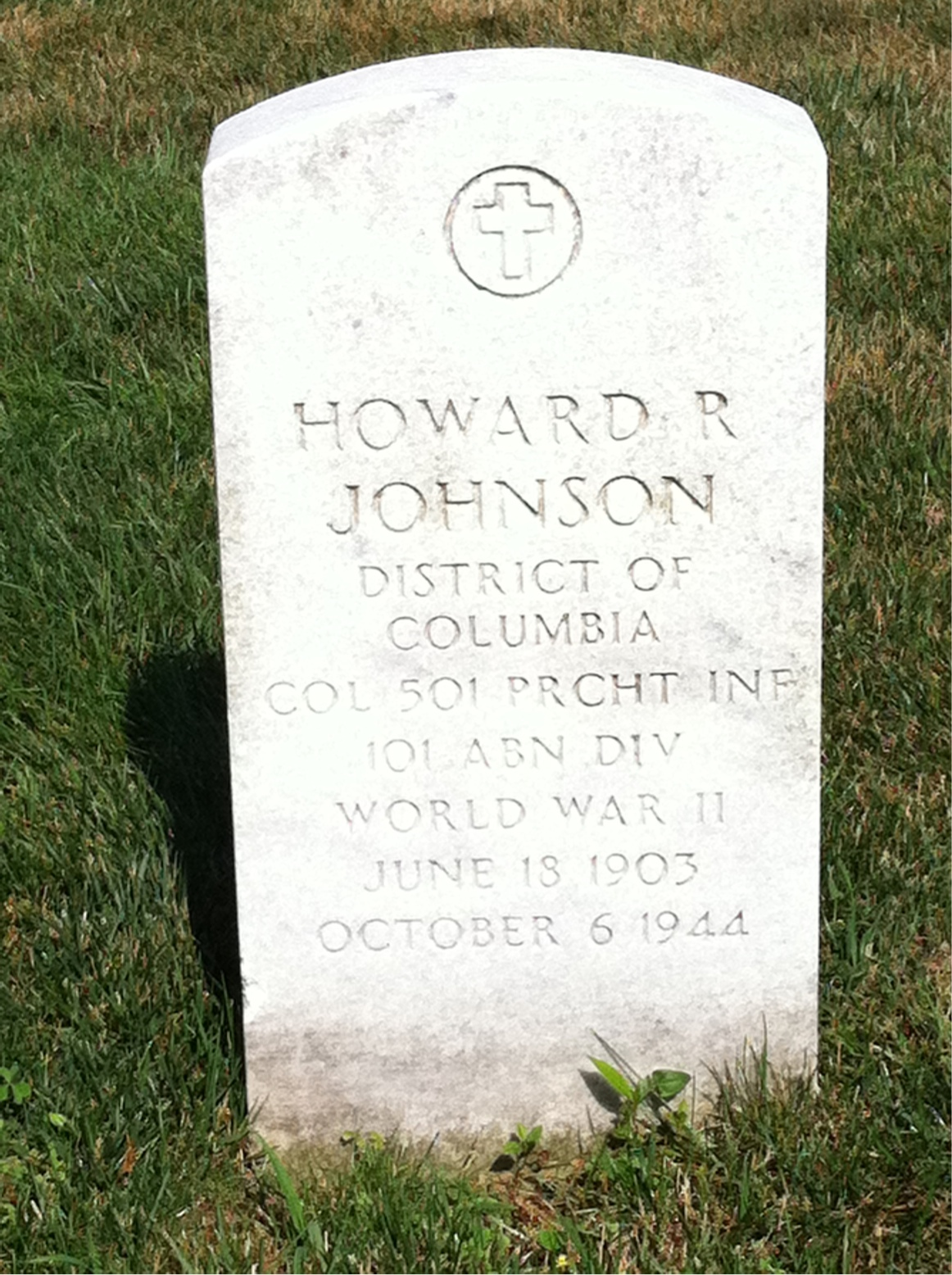
Grave at Arlington National Cemetery

The 101st Airborne was ordered to seize 15 miles (24 km) of highway, including several bridges, in the Netherlands as part of the combined airborne/armored Operation Market Garden. On 17 September 1944 the 501st PIR landed approximately 5 miles (8.0 km) east of its planned drop zone near the town of Veghel.

On 8 October 1944 the 501st PIR was dug in on the "Island" a small strip of land between the Waal and Rhine rivers. Johnson and his young executive officer, Lieutenant Colonel Julian Ewell, a West Point graduate, were visiting the front lines. Suddenly, some mortar shells hit the area killing or wounding several soldiers. A large fragment hit the Johnson in the stomach. The medics knew that the wound was very serious, if not fatal. Two hours later, Johnson groaned, "Take care of my boys" to Ewell and died soon after.
