= Gerald J. Higgins =

United States Army general (1909–1996)

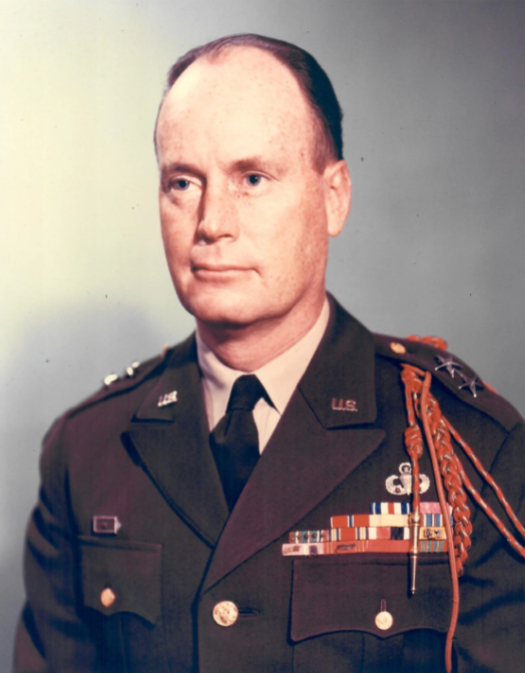
- Born: August 29, 1909; Chicago, Illinois, US
- Died: December 20, 1996 (aged 87); Riverside, California, US
- Burial place: Riverside National Cemetery
- Military career
- Allegiance: United States
- Branch: United States Army
- Service years: 1927–1930 (Enlisted); 1934–1955 (Commissioned)
- Rank: Major general
- Service number: 0-19530
- Unit: Infantry Branch
- Commands: 82nd Airborne Division; United States Army Airborne School
- Conflicts: World War II; Operation Overlord; Operation Market Garden; Battle of the Bulge
- Awards: Silver Star; Legion of Merit; Bronze Star Medal

Gerald Joseph Higgins (August 29, 1909 – December 20, 1996) was a highly decorated officer in the United States Army with the rank of major general. During the Second World War, he served consecutively as the Chief of Staff and Assistant Division Commander, 101st Airborne Division, making him the youngest general officer in the Army Ground Forces at the age of 34.

He began his career as an enlisted man, ultimately received an appointment to the United States Military Academy and completed his career as a major general and commander of the 82nd Airborne Division in 1952.

== Early career ==
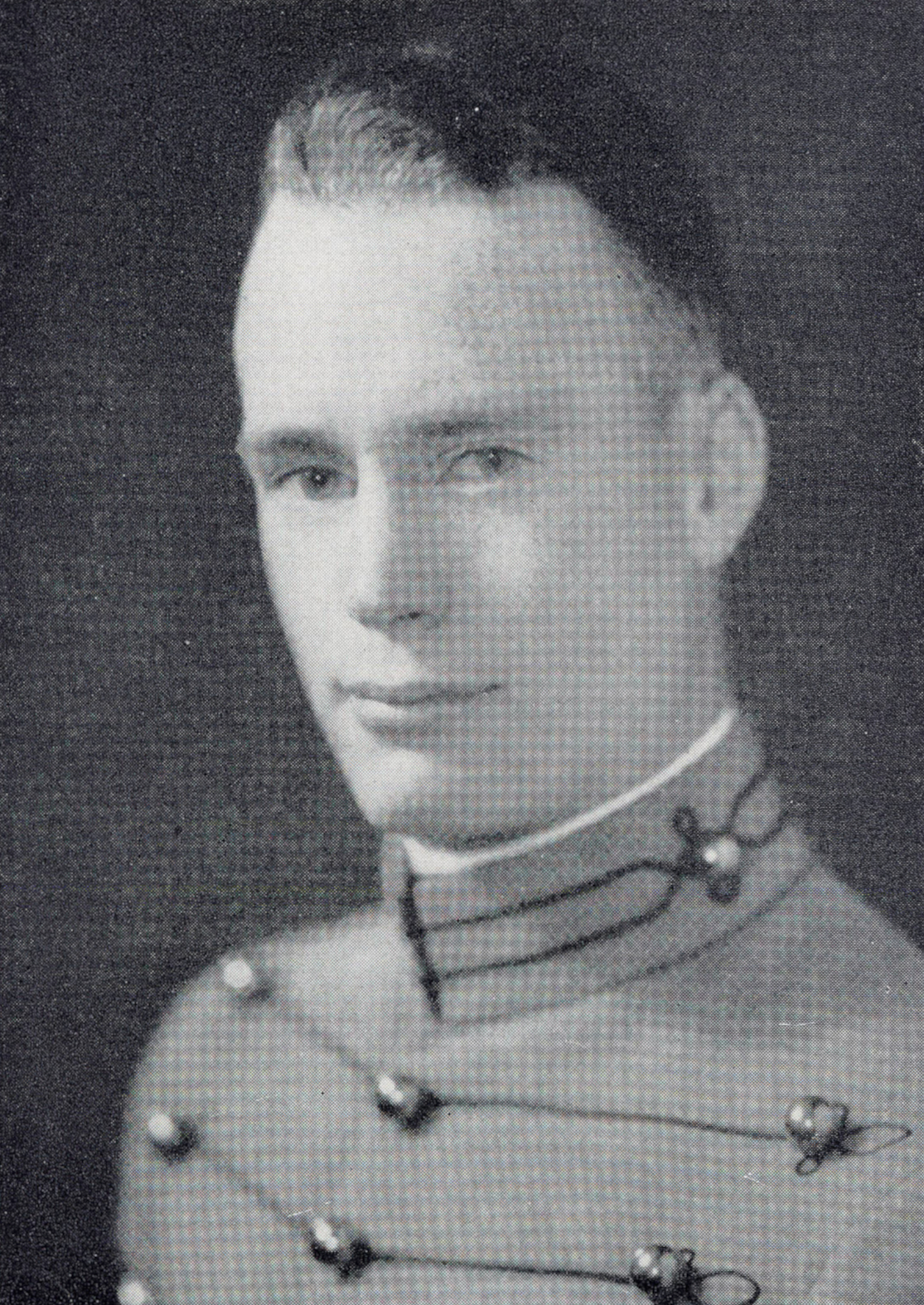
Higgins as a West Point cadet in 1934

Gerald J. Higgins was born on August 29, 1909, in Chicago, Illinois, the son of William Francis Higgins and Martha Martin. Following his graduation from high school in summer 1927, he enlisted in the United States Army as a private and was attached to the 1st Battalion, 35th Infantry Regiment at Schofield Barracks, Hawaii. Higgins rose to the rank of sergeant and received an appointment to the United States Military Academy at West Point, New York, in June 1930.

He graduated with a Bachelor of Science degree on June 12, 1934, and was commissioned a second lieutenant in the Infantry Branch. Higgins served with various infantry units until July 1938, when he entered the Army Infantry School at Fort Benning, Georgia in July 1938. He was meanwhile promoted to first lieutenant on June 12, 1937.

Upon the completion of the Infantry Officer Advanced Course in June 1939, Higgins entered Advanced Communications Officers' Course at Fort Benning and upon completion in June 1940, he was promoted to captain on October 7, 1940.

== World War II ==
Following the United States entry into World War II, Higgins was promoted to major on February 1, 1942, and to lieutenant colonel on October 1 that year. He then joined newly activated 501st Parachute Infantry Regiment at Camp Toccoa, Georgia, which was part of the 101st Airborne Division under Major General William C. Lee. Higgins participated in the early regimental training at Camp Toccoa until August 1942 when he joined General Lee's divisional headquarters as Assistant Chief of Staff for Operations (G-3).

Higgins was appointed Divisional Chief of Staff in March 1943 and promoted to colonel on June 1, 1943. He deployed with the division to England in January 1944 and spent the next five months in intensive ground training. Meanwhile, Major General Lee was relieved of command for reasons of ill health and was succeeded by Maxwell D. Taylor. The 101st Division participated in the Operation Overlord on June 6, 1944, during which the Assistant Division Commander, Brigadier General Don Pratt, was killed in a glider accident while taking part in the landing.

General Taylor chose Higgins as Pratt's replacement, and promoted him to the temporary rank of brigadier general on August 1, 1944, making him the youngest general officer in the Army Ground Forces at the age of 34. Higgins took part in the Operation Market Garden during September 1944, the Ardennes operations in winter 1944/1945, and finished his tenure with the 101st Airborne Division in the Bavarian Alps. He and General Taylor accepted the surrender of German field marshal Albert Kesselring and subsequently participated in the occupation duties in Germany.

For his service with the 101st Airborne Division, Higgins was decorated with the Silver Star, Legion of Merit and the Bronze Star Medal. He was also decorated by the Allies, and received numerous decorations including the Legion of Honour, French Croix de Guerre with Palm, Belgian Order of the Crown, Belgian Croix de Guerre with Palm and the Dutch Order of Orange-Nassau.

== Postwar service ==
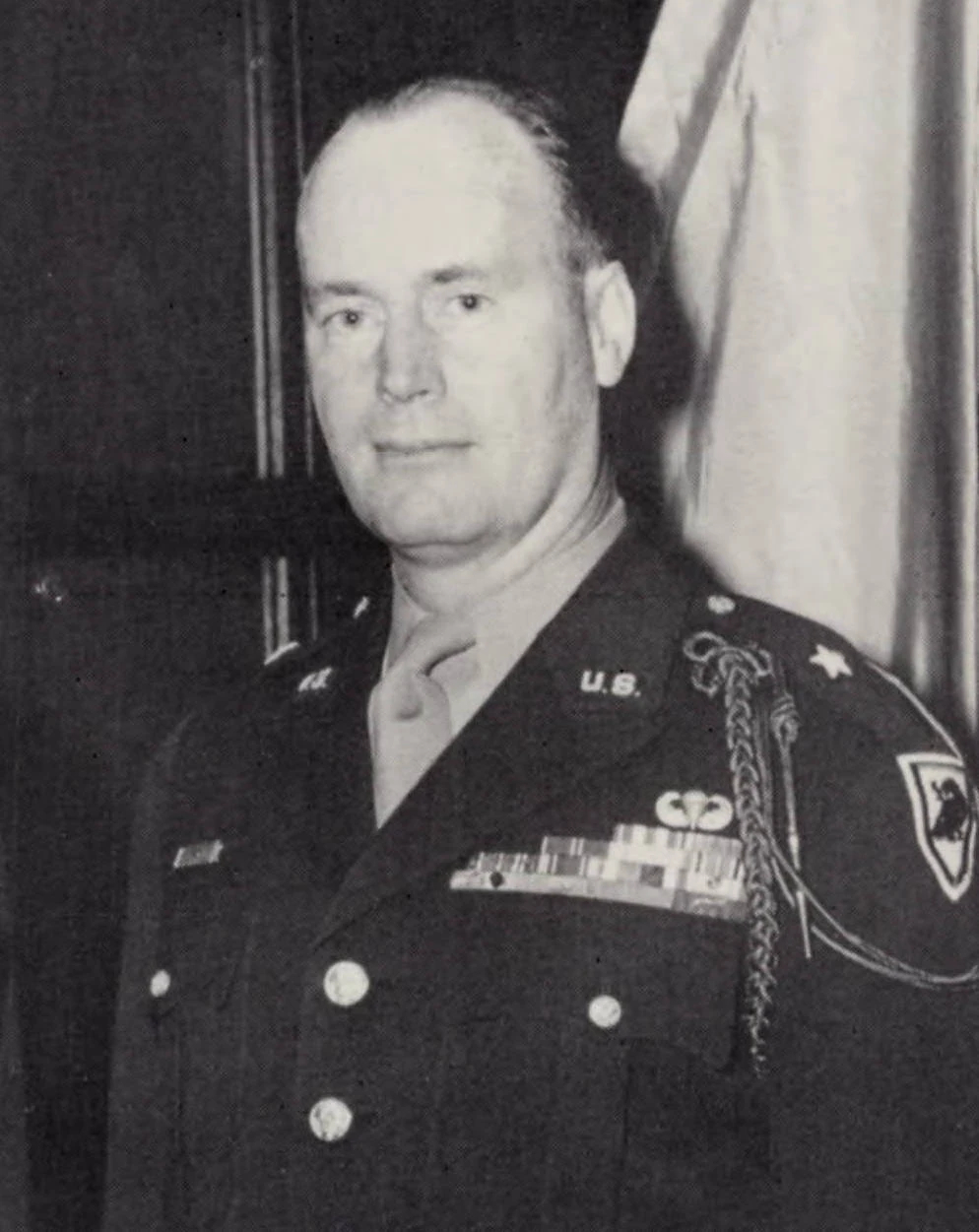
Higgins in 1948.

Higgins returned to the United States in August 1945 and assumed command of the Army Airborne School at Fort Benning, Georgia. He was responsible for the training of Army paratroopers until the end of January 1946, when he was ordered to the United States Military Academy at West Point, New York, for duty as Commandant of Cadets.

He remained in that capacity until June 1948, when he embarked for Japan and joined the 24th Infantry Division under Major General Albert C. Smith as Assistant Commanding General. The division was stationed on Kyushu and maintained order during occupation duties. Higgins was ordered back to the United States in October 1949 and joined the headquarters, 4th Infantry Division at Fort Ord, California.

Higgins participated with the division in the training of new recruits until late 1950, when he was ordered to Washington, D.C., for duty as chief of the Organization & Training Division, Office of the Assistant Chief of Staff for Operations (G-3). He was promoted to major general in September 1952, and assumed command of the 82nd Airborne Division at Fort Bragg, North Carolina.

== Retirement ==
Higgins retired from the army in 1955, and settled in California. He then worked as an assistant on military matters for the president of the American Latex Products Corporation of Hawthorne, California, and the Dayton Rubber Co., Dayton, Ohio. He also later worked in the management of Piasecki Aircraft.

Major General Gerald J. Higgins died on December 20, 1996, aged 87, in Riverside, California. He was married to Mary Elizabeth Roach of Chicago, and together they had two children: Robert and Patricia.

== Decorations ==
Here is the ribbon bar of Major General Gerald J. Higgins:

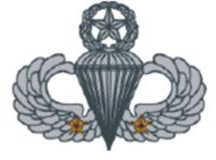

Master Parachutists Badge with two combat jumps
| 1st Row | Silver Star | | Legion of Merit | |
| 2nd Row | Bronze Star Medal | American Defense Service Medal | American Campaign Medal | European-African-Middle Eastern Campaign Medal with four 3/16 inch service stars and Arrowhead device |
| 3rd Row | World War II Victory Medal | Army of Occupation Medal | National Defense Service Medal | Legion of Honour, Knight (France) |
| 4th Row | French Croix de Guerre 1939–1945 with Palm | Belgian Order of the Crown, Officer | Belgian Croix de guerre with Palm | Dutch Order of Orange-Nassau, Officer |
Presidential Unit Citation with Oak Leaf Cluster
Belgian Fourragere
