= Geronimo (exclamation) =

US Army airborne exclamation

Geronimo is a United States Army airborne exclamation occasionally used by jumping paratroopers or, more generally, anyone about to jump from a great height, or as a general exclamation of exhilaration. The cry originated in the United States. Its exact origin is unclear, but it likely ultimately derives from a reference to Geronimo, the Apache military leader.

== Origins ==
At least two different explanations place the origins of the exclamation in Fort Benning, Georgia, where some of the first US Army parachute jumps occurred in the 1940s.

According to paratrooper Gerard Devlin, this exclamation dates from August 1940 and is attributed to Private First Class Aubrey Eberhardt, member of parachute test platoon at Fort Benning. The parachute had only recently been adopted for troop drops, and this platoon was the first to test it. On the eve of their first jump, the platoon decided to calm their nerves by spending the day before taking in a film at the Main Post Theatre and a night at the local beer garden. The film they saw was a Western featuring the Native American Geronimo. Its title is uncertain, but it was probably the 1939 film Geronimo with Andy Devine and Lone Ranger star Chief Thundercloud in the title role. On the way back to barracks, Eberhardt's comrades taunted him saying that he would be too scared to remember his name. Eberhardt retorted, "All right, dammit! I tell you jokers what I'm gonna do! To prove to you that I'm not scared out of my wits when I jump, I'm gonna yell Geronimo loud as hell when I go out that door tomorrow!" Eberhardt kept his promise, and the cry was gradually adopted by the other members of his platoon.

In his book Beyond Band of Brothers: The War Memoirs of Major Richard Winters, Winters offers a different explanation: The 501st Parachute Infantry Regiment at Fort Benning was due to go on the first jump. At the time there was a popular song called "Geronimo" on the radio, which quickly became a favorite amongst the troops. The cry became known to the commanding officer who insisted they would instead jump out and cry "Currahee", the name of a mountain at Camp Toccoa, their first training camp. The paratroopers had run up and down the mountain frequently during training, the run known to the troops as "3 miles up, 3 miles down".

There is also a third explanation. Medicine Bluffs at Fort Sill, Oklahoma, where Geronimo was jailed as prisoner of war and his grave is located, are steep cliffs and have come to be known as Geronimo's Bluff. Tall tales were told about Geronimo while at Fort Sill. It was said that one day Geronimo, with the Army in hot pursuit, made a leap on horseback down an almost vertical cliff, a feat that the posse could not duplicate. The legend continues that in the midst of this jump to freedom he gave out the bloodcurdling cry of "Geronimo-o-o!" when in reality the source of the tale is expected to have come from a famous incident called McColloch’s Leap.

== Response ==
501st Parachute Infantry Regiment Distinctive Unit Insignia

World War II pocket patch and beret flash of the 509th Parachute Infantry Regiment

Initially, the top brass were wary of the cry, claiming that it constituted a lack of discipline. Others said that it showed bravery and should be encouraged. Eventually the latter view won out, and when the Army's paratrooper regiment grew, the cry grew with it. In the early 1940s, the Army's 501st and 509th Parachute Infantry Regiments incorporated the name "Geronimo" into its insignias, with the permission of Geronimo's descendants. By then, the coverage of the paratroopers' exploits during World War II had made the cry "Geronimo" known to the wider public, and its use spread outside the military and U.S. Army.
