= Clifford Chester Sims =

United States Army Medal of Honor recipient

- Born: June 18, 1942; Port St. Joe, Florida, U.S.
- Died: February 21, 1968 (aged 25) near Huế, Republic of Vietnam
- Military career
- Allegiance: United States
- Branch: United States Army
- Service years: 1961–1968
- Rank: Staff Sergeant
- Units: 2nd Battalion (Airborne), 501st Parachute Infantry Regiment, 101st Airborne Division
- Conflicts: Vietnam War: Battle of Hue †
- Awards: Medal of Honor; Purple Heart

Clifford Chester Sims (June 18, 1942 – February 21, 1968) was a United States Army soldier and a recipient of America's highest military decoration—the Medal of Honor—for his actions in the Vietnam War.

== Biography ==
Sims was born Clifford Pittman but was orphaned at an early age. After briefly living in an abandoned school bus and with relatives, he was adopted by James and Irene Sims, at the age of 13. He met his later wife, Mary, at George Washington High School and joined the Army from Jacksonville, Florida shortly after graduation. He moved to Fort Bragg and married Mary on December 25, 1961.

In August 1967, Sims moved to Fort Campbell, Kentucky to join Company D, 2nd Battalion (Airborne), 501st Parachute Infantry Regiment, 101st Airborne Division. By February 21, 1968 he was serving as a staff sergeant. On that day, during an engagement with enemy forces near Huế in the Republic of Vietnam, Sims threw himself onto a triggered booby-trap device. He was killed in the ensuing explosion, but was successful in protecting the members of his squad.

Official eye witness reports of the incident report that:

Before the squad reached their destination they encountered a bunker, and SSG Sims took it upon himself to see if it was empty. As he moved forward a booby trap went off and everybody froze. But SSG Sims shouted a warning then dove on it, fatally wounding him. However he had covered the blast with his own body, and thus saved the lives of those in the area."

[Sims] also saved his squad by moving them quickly out of the way of a house filled with ammunition which was burning. Just as he got his men away the house blew up. Then on moving toward a bunker a booby trap was set off, and Sgt Sims yelled for everybody to get back, but before they could he threw himself on the device taking the entire blast to save his squad from complete disaster. In so doing he gave up his own life. Each and every man of the 2nd Squad owes his very life to this man, Staff Sergeant Clifford C. Sims.

== Medal of Honor citation ==
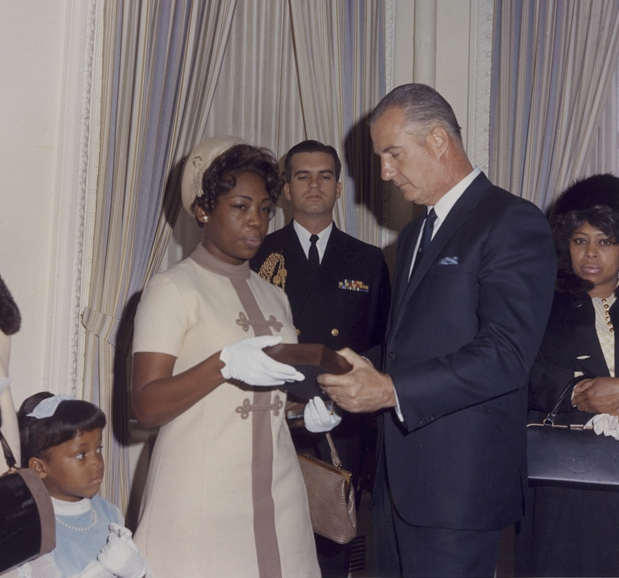
Sims's family members accept his Medal of Honor from Vice President Spiro Agnew

Rank and organization: Staff Sergeant, U.S. Army, Company D, 2d Battalion (Airborne), 501st Infantry, 101st Airborne Division. Place and date: Near Hue, Republic of Vietnam, February 21, 1968. Entered service at: Jacksonville, Fla. Born: June 18, 1942, Port St. Joe, Fla.

Citation:

For conspicuous gallantry and intrepidity in action at the risk of his life above and beyond the call of duty. S/Sgt. Sims distinguished himself while serving as a squad leader with Company D. Company D was assaulting a heavily fortified enemy position concealed within a dense wooded area when it encountered strong enemy defensive fire. Once within the woodline, S/Sgt. Sims led his squad in a furious attack against an enemy force which had pinned down the 1st Platoon and threatened to overrun it. His skillful leadership provided the platoon with freedom of movement and enabled it to regain the initiative. S/Sgt. Sims was then ordered to move his squad to a position where he could provide covering fire for the company command group and to link up with the 3rd Platoon, which was under heavy enemy pressure. After moving no more than 30 meters S/Sgt. Sims noticed that a brick structure in which ammunition was stocked was on fire. Realizing the danger, S/Sgt. Sims took immediate action to move his squad from this position. Though in the process of leaving the area 2 members of his squad were injured by the subsequent explosion of the ammunition, S/Sgt. Sims' prompt actions undoubtedly prevented more serious casualties from occurring. While continuing through the dense woods amidst heavy enemy fire, S/Sgt. Sims and his squad were approaching a bunker when they heard the unmistakable noise of a concealed booby trap being triggered immediately to their front. S/Sgt. Sims warned his comrades of the danger and unhesitatingly hurled himself upon the device as it exploded, taking the full impact of the blast. In so protecting his fellow soldiers, he willingly sacrificed his life. S/Sgt. Sims' extraordinary heroism at the cost of his life is in keeping with the highest traditions of the military service and reflects great credit upon himself and the U.S. Army.

== See also ==
- List of Medal of Honor recipients for the Vietnam War
