= 501st Infantry Regiment =

501st Parachute Infantry Regiment 501st Infantry Regiment 501st Airborne Infantry Regiment
- Coat of arms
- Active: 1942–1945, 1946–present
- Country: United States
- Branch: United States Army
- Type: Airborne forces
- Role: Parachute infantry
- Size: Two battalions
- Part of: United States Army
- Garrison/HQ: Joint Base Elmendorf-Richardson, Alaska and Fort Bragg, North Carolina
- Nickname: GERONIMO
- Motto: "Geronimo!"
- Engagements: World War II; Operation Overlord; Operation Market Garden; Battle of The Bulge; Invasion of Germany; Vietnam War; War in Afghanistan; Iraq War

Commanders
- Current commander: LTC Dwayne Steppe (1st Battalion) and LTC Elijah Myers (2nd Battalion)
- Notable commanders: Howard R. Johnson; Julian Ewell; Joe Hooper

Insignia
- Distinctive unit insignia

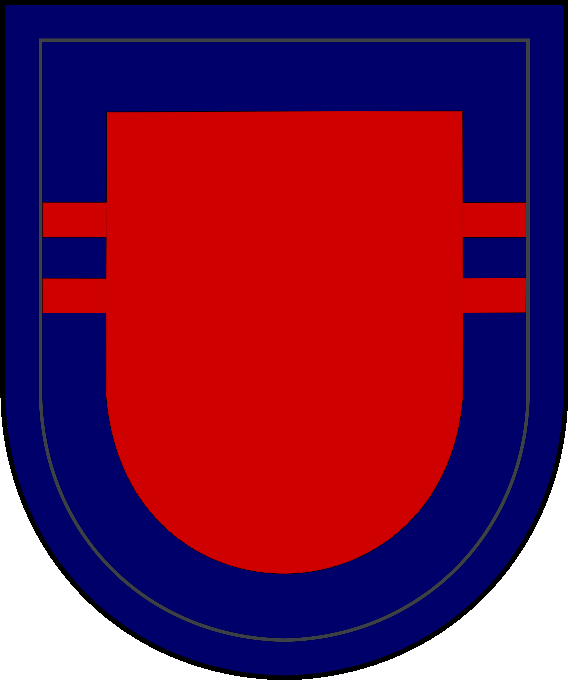
- Beret flashes for the 501st's 1st and 2nd Battalions

- Airborne background trimming for the 501st's 1st and 2nd Battalions

- 501st's WWII airborne background trimming (first every)

The 501st Infantry Regiment, previously the 501st Parachute Infantry Regiment and 501st Airborne Infantry Regiment, is an airborne forces regiment of the United States Army with a long history, having served in World War II and the Vietnam War, both as part of the 101st Airborne Division, as well as the War in Afghanistan. It is the first airborne unit by designation in the United States Armed Forces. Its 1st Battalion is assigned to the 2nd Infantry Brigade Combat Team (Airborne), 11th Airborne Division, located at Fort Richardson, Alaska. Its 2nd Battalion is assigned to the 1st Brigade Combat Team, 82nd Airborne Division, located at Fort Bragg, North Carolina.

== History ==
The following history was provided by 4th Brigade Combat Team (Airborne), 25th Infantry Division, Public Affairs Office.

=== Formation ===
The 501st Parachute Infantry Regiment was activated at Camp Toccoa, Georgia on 15 November 1942. The 501st was part of the 101st Airborne Division during World War II and the Vietnam War.

The famous test platoon, the prime ancestor of all American parachute units, provided the nucleus of the 1st Parachute Battalion, which in turn provided part of the cadre, the unit number, the genealogical lineage and the heraldic background of the 501st Parachute Regiment. Its initial group of officers were hand picked by its first commander, Colonel Howard R. Johnson.

Known by his peers as "Skeets", he was very much in the swashbuckling mold of most of the original parachute regimental commanders, of whom the popular saying was "To command a parachute unit, you don't have to be nuts, but it helps!"

All members of the regiment were parachute volunteers, but only a minor fraction were actually qualified jumpers during training at Camp Toccoa, GA. So, when training was over in March 1943, the unit marched to Atlanta, GA, a distance of 105 miles (169 km). They then moved to Fort Benning, GA, to jump qualify all members not previously trained.

With jump training over, the regiment was assigned to the Airborne Command at Camp MacKall, NC. This was its home base during prolonged maneuvers in North Carolina, Tennessee, and Louisiana, and until January 1944, when the regiment deployed to England, by way of Camp Myles Standish, MA. Once in England the 501st became a permanent attachment of the 101st Airborne Division and was a vital part of that famous unit for the duration of World War II.

In England, training was hard, realistic and became increasingly oriented toward an airborne assault into German-held Europe. Although none of the soldiers knew this initially, the regiment was training for Operation Overlord, the secret allied plan for the combined air, naval, amphibious, and airborne operations to breach Hitler's "Atlantic Wall." As D-Day drew closer, a few key commanders and staff were briefed on the part the 101st would play in Operation Overlord. Then with D-Day just days away, the 501st with the rest of the division was sequestered in well-guarded marshaling camps where every man finally learned his own mission and the overall mission of the 501st and the 101st Airborne Division. These very extensive and intensive briefings were to later prove vital during actual operations.

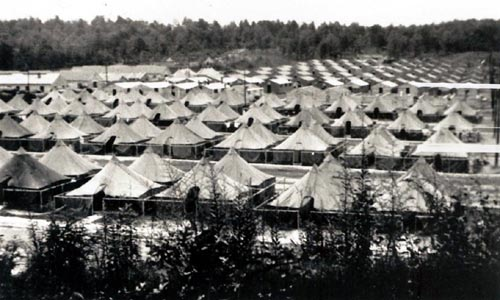
Camp Toccoa, GA, c. 1942

=== D-Day ===
The 501st (less 3rd Battalion) took off from Merryfield Airport at 2245, 5 June 1944, while the 3rd Battalion departed at the same time from Welford. All units flew across the English Channel and were set to drop into Normandy, five hours prior to the seaborne landing. The 501st drop zones were north and east of Carentan. Two battalions were to seize key canal locks at La Barquette and destroy bridges over the Douve River, while the third battalion was in division reserve.

The troop aircraft formations were widely scattered due to a combination of low clouds, poor visibility and enemy anti-aircraft fire. This caused highly scattered drops and units were widely dispersed across the battlefront. The ensuing action bore little resemblance to their briefing, but because the soldiers were well prepared, the regiment and the division accomplished its multiple missions, but none of them as rehearsed. The success was credited to the initiative, stamina, and daring of individual parachutists, who decided how best to accomplish some part of the overall mission. The capture of a key causeway from Utah Beach at Pouppeville by a scratch force of about 100 officers and men, formed around a detachment from the 3rd Battalion (division reserve) of the 501st, was typical. Members of this ad hoc force included both General Maxwell Taylor and Assistant Division Commander Gerald Higgins. General Taylor later quipped that, "Never were so few led by so many."

Shoulder sleeve insignia of the 101st Airborne Division. The 501st was assigned to 101st Airborne during World War II and Vietnam.

Fierce fighting in Normandy continued with assisting the amphibious landings and joining the beach at Utah with that at Omaha. The efforts of the 501st came at high cost: the regiment lost 898 men killed, wounded, missing, or captured.

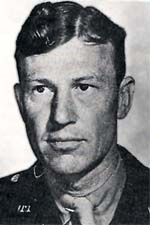
Colonel Howard R. Johnson. The first commander of the 501st PIR

The 501st returned to its base in England in mid-July, slowly regaining its pre-D-Day capabilities with many replacements and another round of intensive training. They received a presidential citation for their action in Normandy. They were briefed on several planned air assaults into France, each aborted when the Allies overran planned objectives.

=== Operation Market Garden ===
In the early fall of 1944 the 501st began preparing for an airborne assault into the occupied Netherlands.

Code-named "Market Garden," it combined a deep airborne thrust through the west of the Netherlands by the 1st Allied Airborne Army, with an overland drive by the British 2nd Army. The plan visualized airborne forces seizing key bridges over rivers and canals so 2nd Army could move very deep and fast over a distance of more than 100 miles (160 km), past the Rhine River, the last major water obstacle short of Berlin. This airborne assault would be made in daylight. The 101st Airborne Division was assigned the southernmost bridges at Eindhoven, Son, Sint Oedenrode and Veghel, with the 501st assigned the Veghel Bridges. The airborne assault went as scheduled on 17 September 1944, with an improved performance by troop carrier units. Most drop zones were hit with good drop patterns.

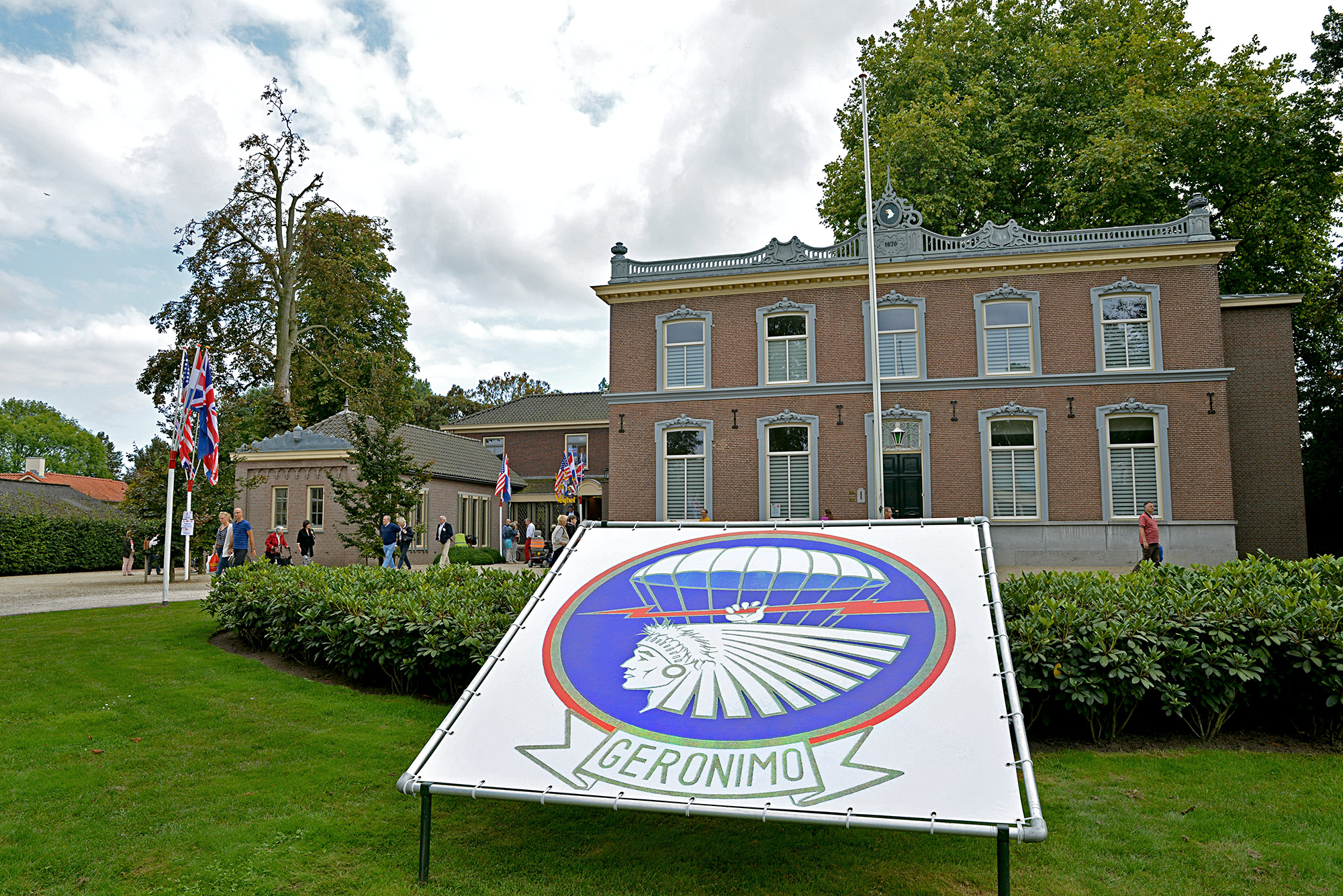
Former headquarters of the 501st Parachute Infantry Regiment 'Klondike' in Veghel. The insignia of the 101st Airborne Division can still be seen on the top of the facade

1st Battalion, 501st Parachute Infantry Regiment, however, was dropped some 5 miles (8.0 km) east of its planned drop zone. In spite of this, the four bridges in Veghel were captured intact. Then began the really difficult part of the operation, keeping open the highway over which 2nd Army must pass to reach the British 1st Airborne Division, which was fighting for its life at the northern end of the airborne corridor. The fatal flaw in the plan became more evident each day as the forces proved too few to both keep open the key highway and also fight on to a linkup with the British Airborne across the Rhine. The 1st Airborne Division paid the full price for this flaw as they went down fighting against overwhelming odds; less than two thousand men escaped death or capture.

The 501st, with the rest of the division, moved from initial objective areas to positions on "the island" between the Waal and Rhine Rivers; it became clear that they would not be withdrawn from the Netherlands after a few days, as they had been told; their manpower was too much needed by the hard-pressed British. The prolonged fighting on "the island" was anything but the way to use an airborne unit. After the initial hard fighting it became a static war of patrolling and attrition, principally by artillery and mortars. One such mortar attack, near Heteren, on 8 October 1944, fatally wounded Colonel Johnson. As he was being evacuated, his last words to LTC Ewell were, "Take care of my boys."

The unit suffered 661 casualties. LTC Julian Ewell, a graduate of West Point, succeeded COL Johnson. Much less an extrovert than Johnson, he more than made up for any lack of "flash and dash" with a keen mind, tactical prescience and all around professional competence.

=== Battle of the Bulge ===
After 72 days of combat in the Netherlands the division returned to a new staging area in Mourmelon, France, for what everyone thought would be a long, well-deserved rest. Accordingly, many men were on leave or pass, the Division Commander was in the United States, the Assistant Division Commander was in England (leaving the Artillery Commander, General McAuliffe, in command), and there still were major shortages of equipment and supplies that had not been replaced after the Netherlands.

The division was ill-prepared for the word they received in the late evening of 17 December. The Germans had launched a major offensive at dawn on 16 December through the Ardennes in the lightly held sector of VII Corps. At that time SHAEF's Reserve consisted of the 101st and the 82nd. The 101st was ordered to move "truckborne" to Bastogne, the hub town of a major radial road net, to stem the oncoming Germans. General McAuliffe ordered the move by regimental combat teams without waiting for any absentees. The 501st was the lead combat team in the division move, and after a grueling truck ride, reached Bastogne at about 2230 hrs. By midnight, the 501st was the only regiment combat team ready for action. Ewell asked McAuliffe for a definite assignment and was ordered to move out on the eastern road through Longvilly and seize and hold a key road junction beyond Longvilly. The 501st was the first to fight at Bastogne when one of its battalions ran into the enemy near Neffe, a few kilometers out of Bastogne.

During the defense of Bastogne, the 501st gave up not one foot of ground, and helped the Allies thwart everything the Germans threw at them. This ruined Hitler's offensive time table and eventually won the 101st a Presidential Unit Citation.

Once again, the 501st suffered heavy casualties with 580 killed, wounded or captured. One casualty was Colonel Ewell, who was badly wounded and relinquished command to LTC Robert Ballard, who had commanded 2nd Battalion from the beginning. Ballard who was not a professional soldier like Johnson or Ewell, but an officer who had learned how to command quietly and effectively while winning the admiration and respect of his men. Ballard continued in command of the 501st until the end of World War II. Following VE-Day, the regiment was ordered to move back to billets in Joigny and Auxerre, France. Troops were advised not to take any captured cars or loot with them.

Once in France the 501st began training for an invasion of Japan. On 20 August 1945, the 501st was disbanded, ahead of the inactivation of the 101st Division in November 1945.

=== Cold War ===
The 501st was reconstituted on 1 August 1946 at Fort Benning, GA, as the 501st Parachute Infantry Battalion but was inactivated there on 23 November 1948. Between 1951 and 1956 the 501st served with the 101st as a Regular Army non-Airborne training unit on two occasions, once at Camp Breckinridge, KY., and once at Fort Jackson, SC. In the spring of 1956, the 501st and the 101st moved (less personnel and equipment) to Fort Campbell, KY, where they were activated as a provisional organization to test the "Pentomic concept. The word pentomic referred to the five battle groups, which were in lieu of regiments and to the division's or ganic atomic weapon capability. One of the five battle groups was the 1st Airborne Battle Group, 501st Infantry. Its first commander was COL Harry Kinnard, who had been a member of the World War II regiment and also G-3 of the division from the Netherlands. As to matters on lineage, on 25 April 1957, the 501st Regiment ceased to exist as a tactical unit and was re-designated as the 501st Infantry, a parent regiment under the combat arms regimental system. Simultaneously, on the same date, Company A, 501PIR was reorganized and re-designated as Headquarters and Headquarters Company, 1st Airborne Battle Group, 501st Infantry, and remained assigned to the 101st Airborne Division (organic elements were concurrently constituted and activated). An element of the 501st actually served with the 82nd Airborne Division when the 82nd reconfigured in the pentomic format. On 1 September 1957, Company B, 501PIR was reorganized and re-designated as Headquarters and Headquarters Company, 2nd Airborne Battle Group, 501st Infantry as an organic element of the 82nd Airborne Division, and activated at Fort Bragg, NC (concurrently, organic elements constituted and activated at Fort Bragg). When the pentatonic concept gave way to the Reorganization Objective Army Division (ROAD), with brigades and battalions instead of battle groups, the 2nd Airborne Battle Group, 501st Infantry was reorganized and re-designated as the 2nd Battalion, 501st Infantry. On 1 February 1964, its colors were relieved from assignment to the 82nd and assigned to the 101st at Fort Campbell, KY. The 101st was also reorganized as a ROAD airborne division, and the 1st Airborne Battle Group, 501st Infantry became the 1st Battalion, 501st Infantry, of the 101st.

=== Vietnam War ===
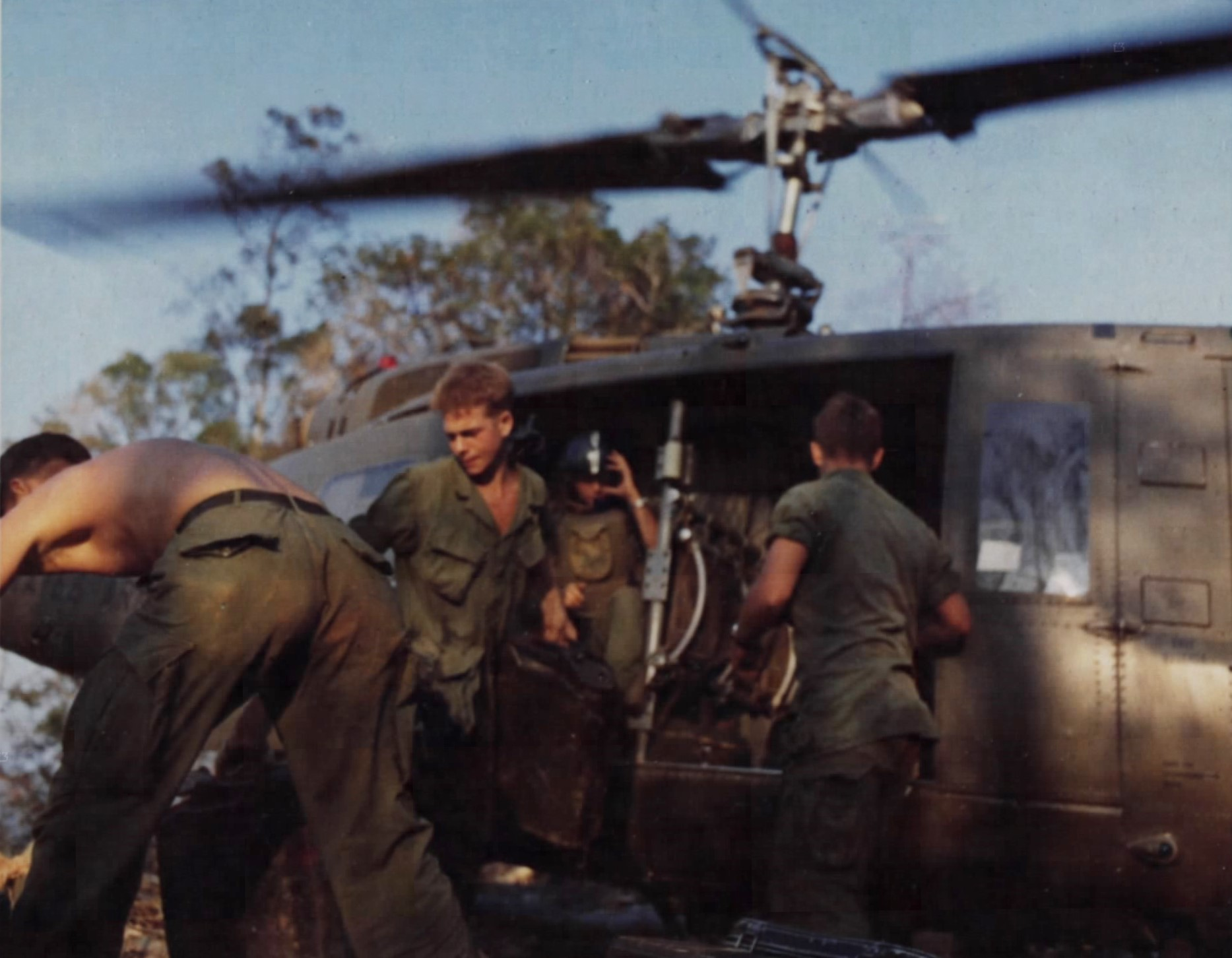
Soldiers unloading supplies from a helicopter at Firebase Birmingham on January 28, 1969.

When the 101st deployed to South Vietnam in 1967, it included the 1st and 2nd Battalions of the 501st. The division participated in twelve campaigns and was decorated by the Republic of Vietnam on three occasions. The 2nd Battalion, 501st, while attached to the 3rd Brigade, 101st received a Presidential Unit Citation for their actions during the Battle of Hamburger Hill in May 1969; the unit's battle streamer is embroidered Dong Ap Bia Mountain. The 2nd Battalion, 501st participated in Operation Texas Star, which culminated in the Battle of Fire Support Base Ripcord in July 1970. The entire 101st participated in Operation Dewey Canyon II, in support of the ARVN attack on the Ho Chi Minh Trail in Laos in February–March 1971.

In May 1968 the 101st's jump status was terminated and it was reorganized as an Airmobile division.

=== Post Vietnam ===
As part of the post-Vietnam reorganization, the 2nd Bn, 501st Infantry was inactivated on 31 July 1972, and in the restructuring to the U.S. Army regimental system, the 1st Bn, 501st Infantry was inactivated at Fort Campbell on 5 June 1984. In October 1989 the 501st Regiment was reorganized under the U.S. Army Regimental System with headquarters at Fort Richardson, Alaska. Simultaneously, 1st Bn (Abn), 501st Infantry was assigned to the 6th Infantry Division and activated at Fort Richardson. The 6th, formed when the 172nd Infantry Brigade was expanded to a division, was inactivated during the post-Cold War draw down and reverted again to the 172nd Infantry Brigade (United States). The 1st Bn (Abn), 501st Inf was made a separate battalion combat team for a short period of time, around which the 4th Brigade (Airborne), 25th Infantry Division was constructed and later redesignated to 2nd Infantry Brigade (Airborne), 11th Airborne Division in June 2022, where it serves to this day. Of the three original parachute regiments organic or attached to the 101st Airborne Division in World War II, the 501st remains as the only unit on jump status.

=== Operation Enduring Freedom ===
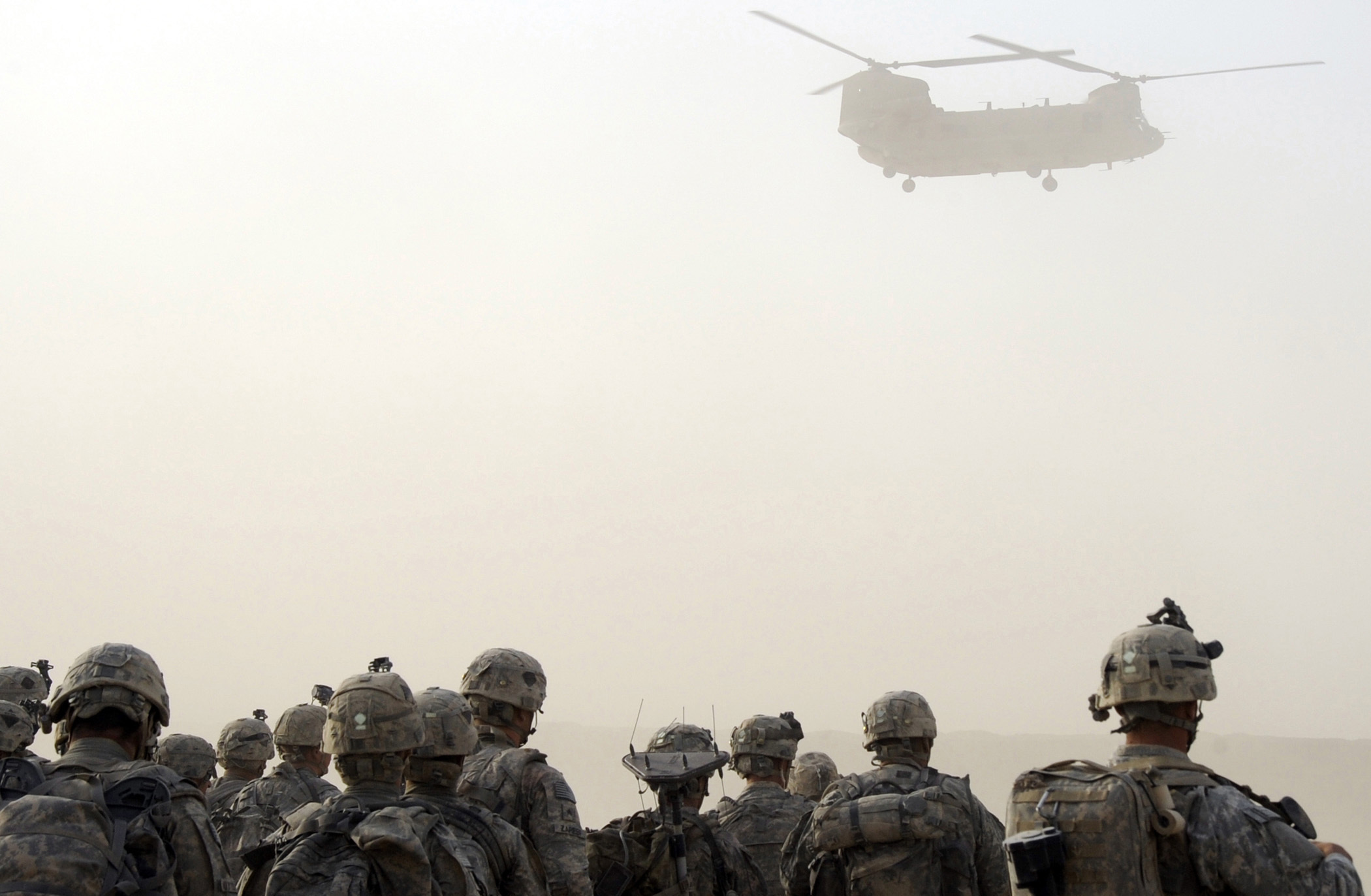
Paratroopers watching a CH-47 Chinook helicopter as it lands during a dust storm at Forward Operating Base Kushamond, Afghanistan, July 9, 2004.

OEF IV-V: JTF 1–501 deployed to Operation Enduring Freedom – Afghanistan from October 2003 until August 2004 under the direct command of CJTF-180 and 1st Brigade, 10th Mountain Division. Its first mission was to open the 'Khowst-Gardez Pass', also known as 'Ambush Alley' during the Russian/Soviet occupation. After a successful and (almost) uncontested Ground Assault Convoy (GAC) through Ambush Alley, the 501st based itself just outside the city of Khowst, helping to build what became known as FOB Salerno (Forward Operating Base Salerno), near the eastern border with Pakistan. The 501st played a significant role in disrupting enemy communications and infiltrations across the border in their Area of Operation. Commanded by LTC Harry C. Glenn, the 501st conducted coordinated searches and patrolled the mountains during Operations Avalanche, Blizzard, and Storm, in which its mission was to root out Taliban and Al Qaeda loyalists in the Khowst Province and Paktia Province. The natives of the region, mainly the Pashtun, were—more often than not—both enemies and allies to the 501st, making the mission that much more difficult. However, in comparison to the prior Soviet occupation, within just a few visits and 'elder tea meetings', the 501st quickly earned the trust of the local people and militia/warlords. As a result of the unit's time in-country, few enemies were killed, yet many were detained and captured when necessary (using an incredibly strict system that often resulted in capturing and re-capturing individuals, until it was proved that they were definitely 'enemy combatants'). Local Pashtun shepherds would even inform the 501st when non-local 'Arabs' planted IEDs (improvised explosive devices)/bombs on roads and trade routes, such that the 501st could help protect the local people. In addition, the 501st collected/confiscated tons upon tons of ammunition and weapons, which were destroyed, in the attempt to make the region safer for everyone (as referenced by direct US military reports in WikiLeaks). During the occupation, the 501st conducted countless cordon and searches while confronting enemy combatants in direct battles. Furthermore, the 501st secured the Afghani border, organized the first known meeting between Afghani/Pakistani Officials since the Durand Line was established, created inter and intrastate commerce, advised on (and helped build) civil-security, conducted 'tail-gate' medicine to help with local health and prosperity issues, and even provided security for male and female children schools (often the target of radical Islam terrorist operations), with the overall intent to secure the entire region for local Democratic elections and allow for mutual peace and mutual prosperity of the Afghani/Pakistani region. The 1–501 was supported by an Air Force Special Operations Team (TACP), commanded by Captain A. Rodell Severson. http://www.airforcetimes.com/legacy/new/0-AIRPAPER-2817838.php. The TACP went on all missions, providing Battlespace Control for the Geronimos and were an integral part of the Joint Task Force.

=== Iraq War ===
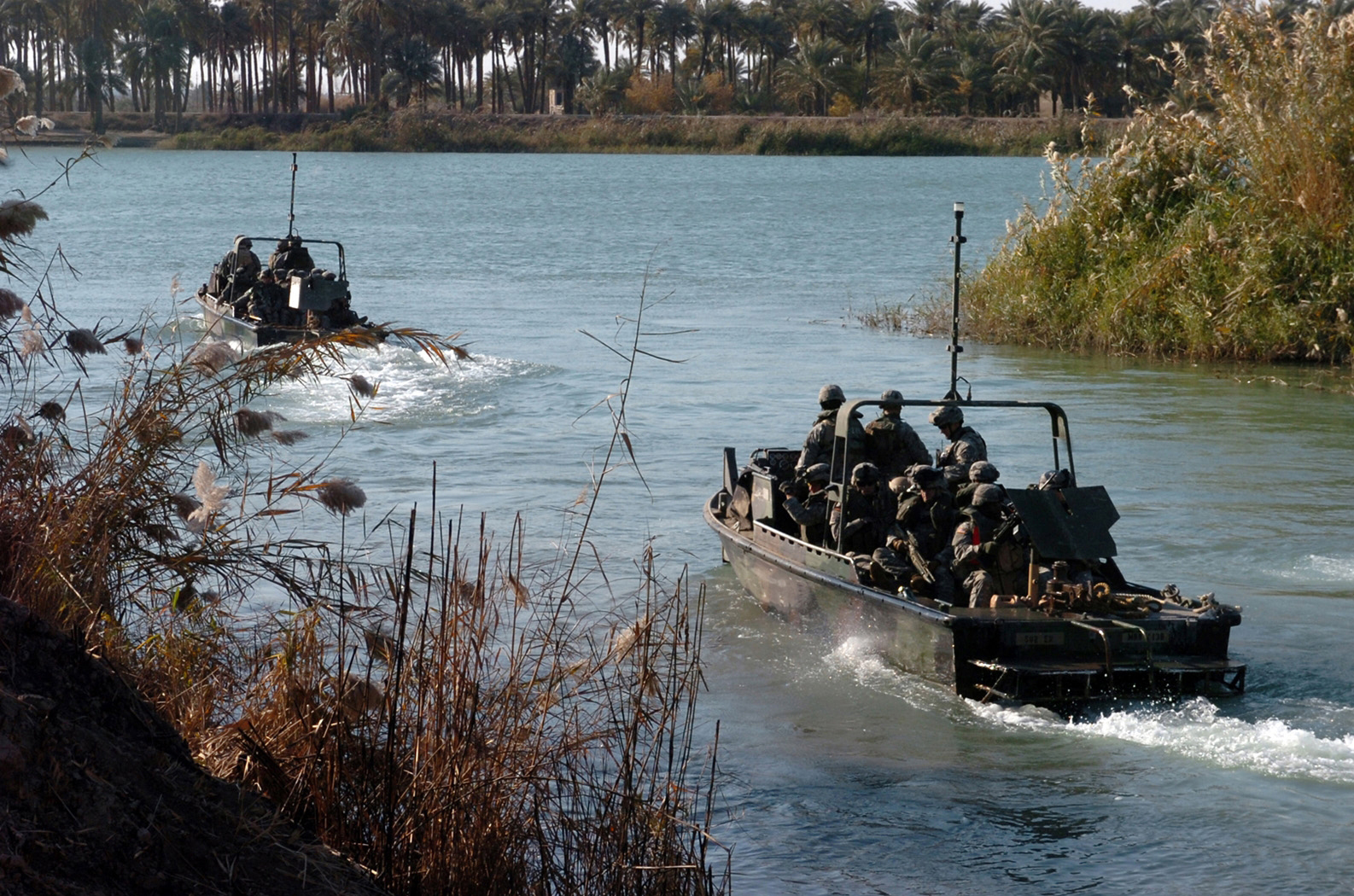
Scouts from 1–501st Infantry Regiment (Airborne) conducting amphibious operations from FOB Iskandariyah in 2007.

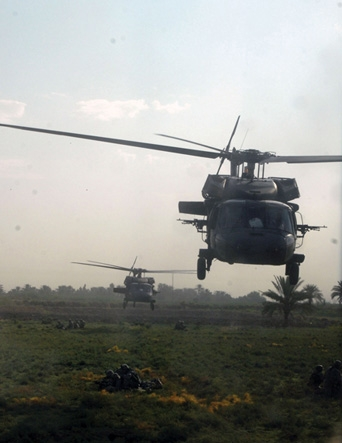
Paratroopers from 1–501st Infantry Regiment (Airborne) conduct an air insertion as part of Operation Gecko north of Jurf as Sakhr, Iraq in 2007.

OIF VI-VIII: The 501st deployed as part of its parent brigade in September 2006 until October 2007, and the final elements returned in December 2007 as part of a 14-month tour in north Babil Province, Iraq, 35 miles (56 km) south of Baghdad. The unit was the tenant organization at FOB Iskandariyah and conducted full-spectrum operations in the area's major population centers: Bahbahani, Jurf as Sakhr, Musayyib and Tahrir.

The 501st was also responsible for support to operations in the city and province of Karbala and provided paratroopers for additional contingency operations in Al Anbar Governorate, An Najaf and Hillah. For six months, the 501st with attachments was also responsible for the cities of Iskandariyah and Haswah as well as surrounding rural communities.

Through the combined use of ground, air and amphibious operations, the unit was credited with the capture or neutralization of multiple ranking insurgents and bringing a strong measure of security to the area, as well as bolstering the capabilities of Iraqi security and defense forces. The 501st served under the divisional control of both the 1st Cavalry Division as part of Multi-National Division-Baghdad and the 3rd Infantry Division as a component of Multi-National Division-Central. The unit was awarded the Valorous Unit Award, the second highest unit award in the US Army, for its efforts during the 2006–2007 deployment.

=== War in Afghanistan ===
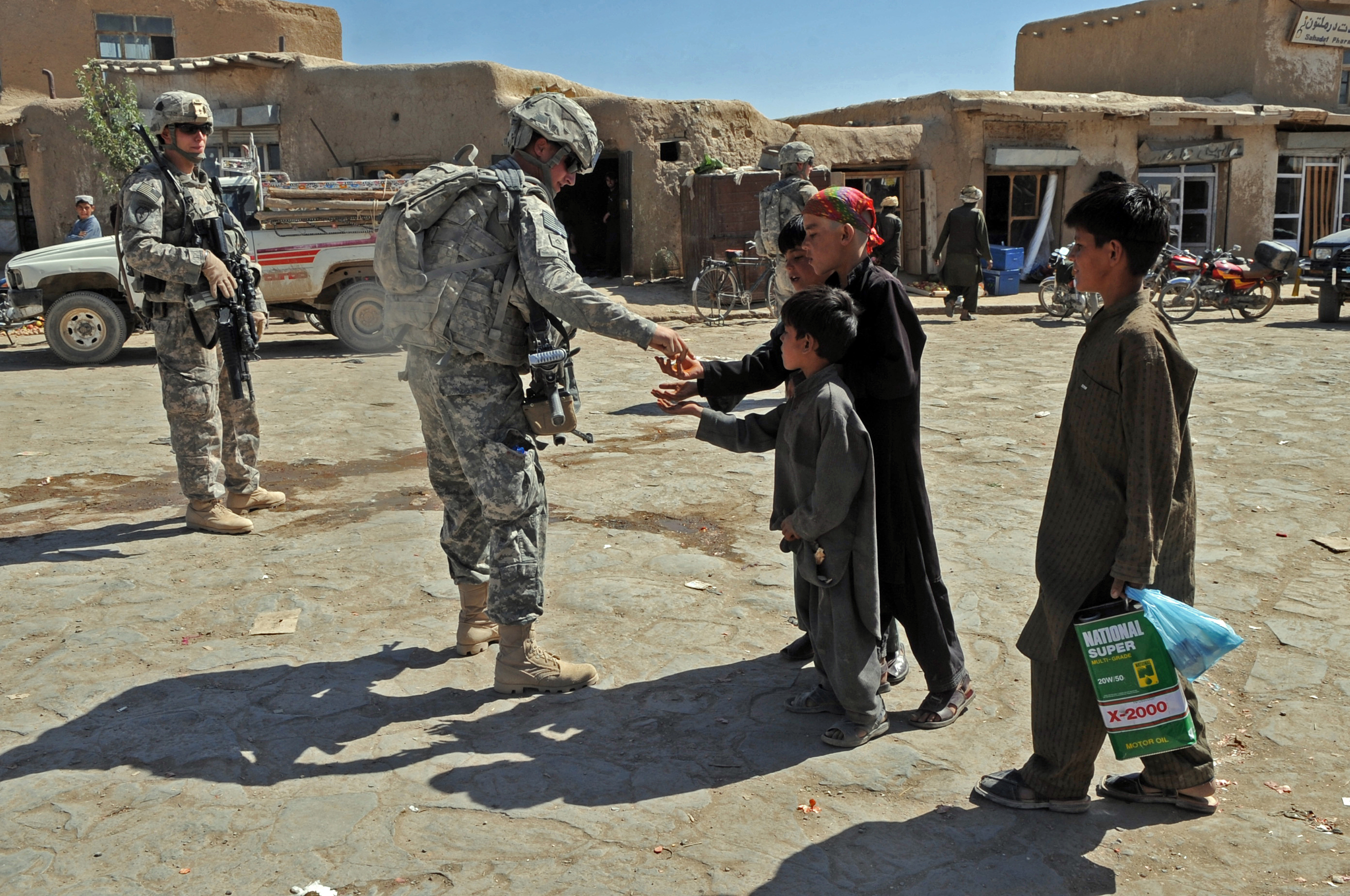
Paratroopers hand candy to local children while on patrol in the Paktika Province on 19 October 2009.

OEF IX-X: In February 2009, just 14 months after returning from its 15-month deployment to Iraq, the 501st deployed for the second time to eastern Afghanistan as a part of Regional Command East, International Security Assistance Force. The battalion's area of combat operations included Khost and Paktika provinces, all on the border with Pakistan; brigade headquarters was at Forward Operating Base Salerno in Khost. Known as Task Force Yukon. 1–501 IN BN (ABN) was called Task Force 1 Geronimo and conducted counterinsurgency operations for 12 months in partnership with Afghan National Security Forces and supervised governance, development, and agriculture projects in coordination with the Afghan government. The battalion redeployed to Fort Richardson in March 2010. The welcome home ceremony was held on 25 March 2010 at the Sullivan Arena in Anchorage with Alaska Governor Sean Parnell in attendance. Seven soldiers were killed in action during the deployment; they are honored with a large stone memorial located in front of the battalion headquarters at Fort Richardson. For its efforts in Afghanistan in 2009–2010, the battalion was, once again, awarded the Valorous Unit Award for their actions.

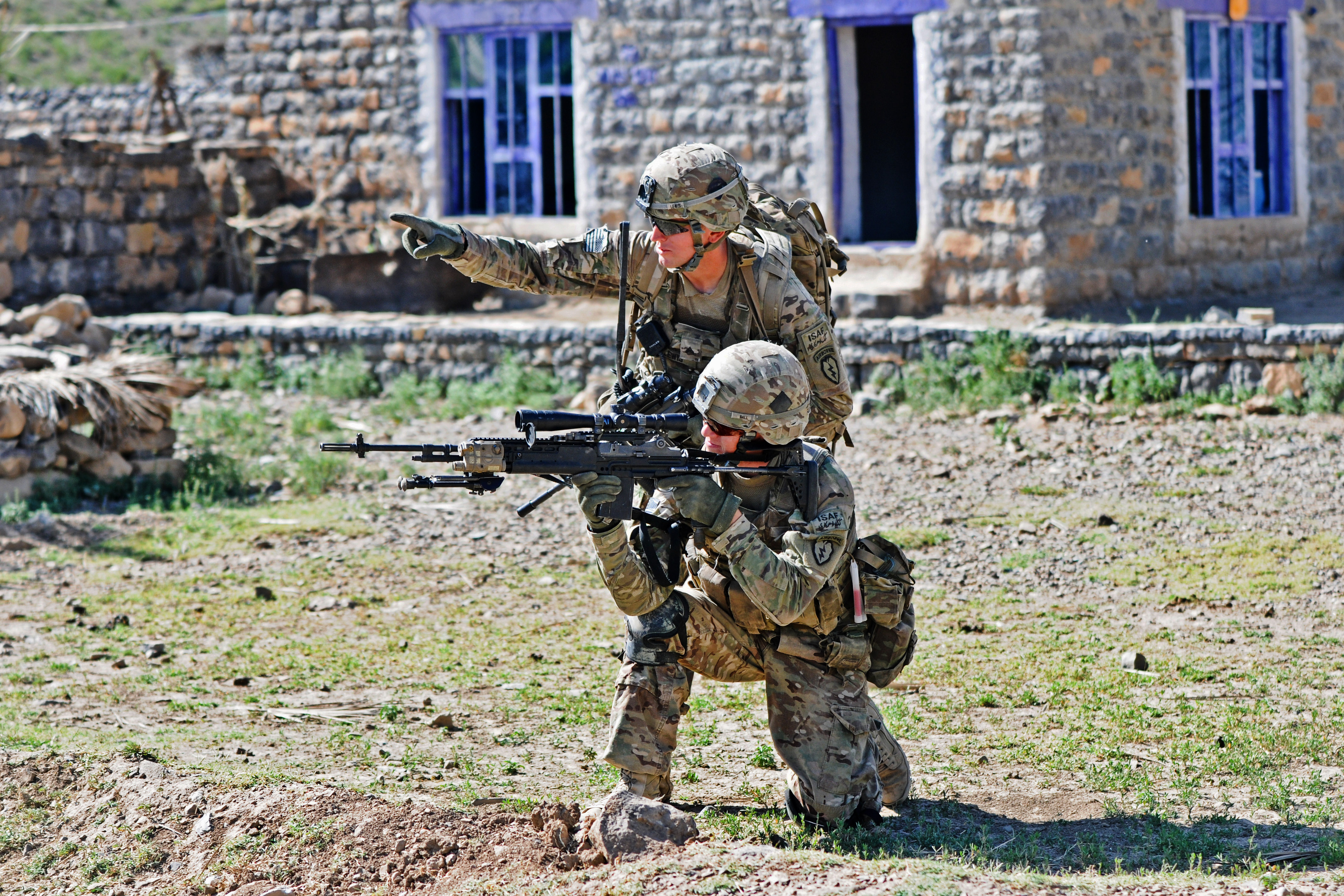
Corporal Brian Lewis, back, points at a possible enemy to Private First-Class Josh Ball during a dismounted patrol in Khowst province on June 2, 2012.

OEF XII-XIII: ↵After 18 months of dwell time at their home station Joint Base Elmendorf-Richardson, Alaska, 1–501 IN (ABN) deployed once again to Operation Enduring Freedom XII-XIII in December 2011. As one of the three maneuver battalions of 4th Brigade Combat Team, 25th Infantry Division – Task Force Spartan – 1–501 IN (ABN), known operationally as Task Force Blue Geronimo, assumed authority of central and eastern Khost province. Task Force Spartan, with a higher headquarters at Regional Command East, International Security Assistance Force, was arrayed across Khost and Paktia Provinces to combat Taliban and Haqqani Network elements. Both the battalion and brigade headquarters were located at Forward Operating Base Salerno in Khost city.

For ten months, through October 2012, the 501st aggressively countered Taliban and Haqqani Network infiltrations into and through Khost province. At the same time, the task force trained two battalions of Afghan National Army, two zones of Afghan Border Police, and the entire contingent of Afghan Uniformed Police (Khost) to conduct security operations with lessening dependence on ISAF assistance. Elements of the task force were sent into Paktia and Paktika provinces on various week-long operations to supplement 3rd Battalion, 509th Infantry Regiment (Airborne) and 1st Squadron, 40th Cavalry Regiment (Airborne) from 4/25 ABCT as well as 1st Battalion, 28th Infantry Regiment from 4th Brigade Combat Team, 1st Infantry Division. Eight soldiers of Task Force Blue Geronimo were killed in action in Khost province; they are memorialized on a stone monument in front of battalion headquarters at Fort Richardson, where their names are transplanted among other fallen paratroopers of the 1st Battalion, 501st Infantry Regiment (Airborne).

=== Operation Freedom's Sentinel ===
In September 2017 1-501 PIR deployed to Afghanistan as Task Force 1 Geronimo. TF 1 Geronimo operated under the two missions Operation Freedom's Sentinel and NATO-led Operation Resolute Support. As part of ORS the battalion was arrayed throughout Afghanistan to advise, train, and assist Afghan Forces. As part of OFS the battalion provided base defense at several locations along the Afghanistan-Pakistan border which allowed Special Forces to run operations against ISIS-K in Achin District, Nangarhar province. The task force was headquartered in Forward Operating Base Fenty near Jalalabad. Despite several skirmishes with ISIS-K in the valleys along the Pakistan border there were no soldiers killed in action throughout the eight-month deployment. 2-501st PIR deployed to Kabul, Afghanistan on August 15, 2021 as part of joint efforts to evacuate American personnel and American allies. A prior paratrooper of the Battalion, SSG Knaus, was one of thirteen casualties during the deployment.

== Motto ==
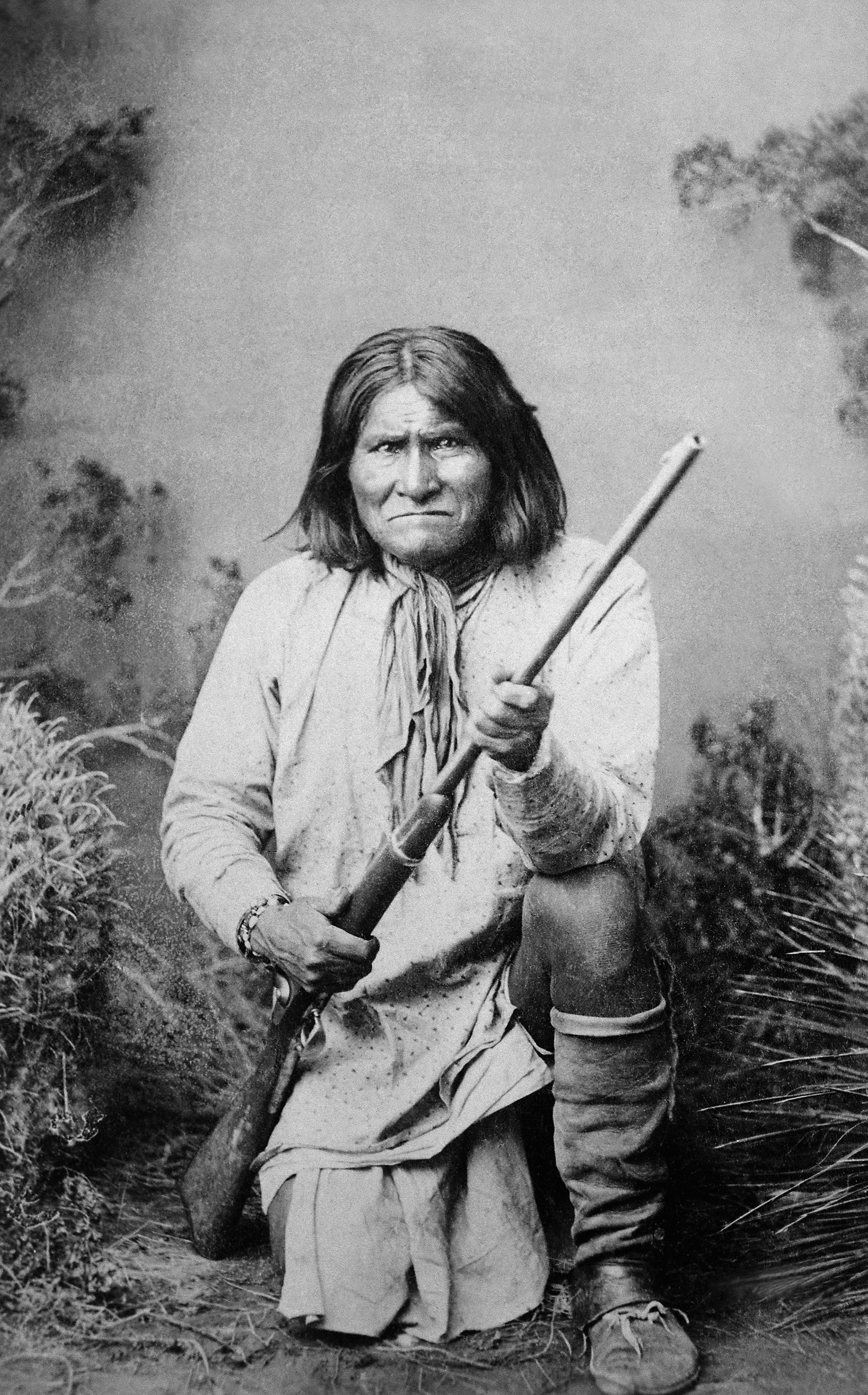
Geronimo; The basis for the unit's motto and slogan.

The unit's motto is "Geronimo," a phrase that has become synonymous with paratroopers and parachutists in general.

The motto dates from 1940 and the lead up to World War II. The night before their first attempt to prove the feasibility of a mass jump, some U.S. paratroopers at Fort Benning watched the film Geronimo (1939). While drinking with fellow paratroopers after the show, Private Aubrey Eberhardt announced he would shout the name "Geronimo" when he jumped to prove he was not scared. He followed through with his promise and the practice soon caught on within the unit, becoming its unofficial motto. When the 501st was created the name was confirmed as the unit's official motto with the permission of the real Geronimo's family.

== The Black Diamonds ==
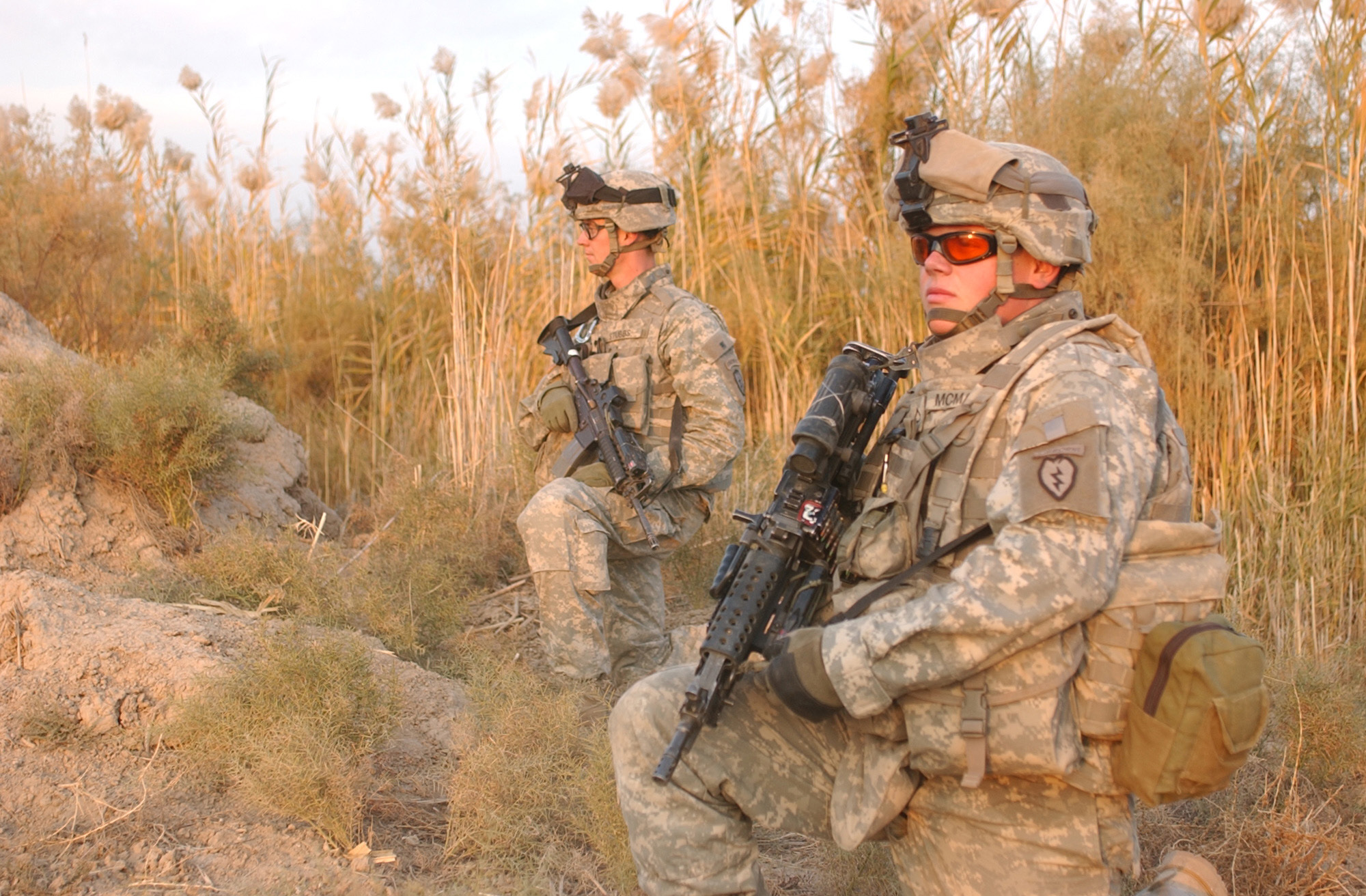
The modern cloth diamonds of the 501st sewn to the Army Combat Uniform helmet cover, as seen in Iraq. An additional patch is sewn to the opposing side out of view.

During World War II, the 101st Airborne Division undertook steps to identify paratroopers from each divisional element visually. As a result, a suit from a deck of cards was painted on the helmets of the division's four infantry regiments. The helmets of the members of 501st were therefore emblazoned with a white diamond and each respective battalion was indicated with a white tick mark. During the Vietnam War the Diamond as well as the Spade, Heart and Club were used on the helmet by units of the 101st Airborne Division but instead of white it was black and most of the time a black permanent marker was the only thing needed to apply it. Post Vietnam the tradition carried on through the late 1970s. The modern day members of the 501st resurrected the tradition in 2003 prior to deployment to Afghanistan with two black cloth patches sewn to each side of their helmet covers. The tradition was carried over after the switch to the Army Combat Uniform as part of the Rapid Fielding Initiative in 2006 and again worn in Iraq. The emblem has entered common usage among members of the current battalion outside of helmet insignia, appearing on unit clothing, challenge coins and other souvenirs. A similar insignia has been recently appropriated for use by the current 101st Aviation Brigade to match that of other elements within the 101st Airborne Division which chose to use their original World War II regimental helmet markings. Despite their use of the diamond patches, there is no historical connection between the use of the insignia in World War II and the 101st Aviation Brigade. The brigade links their current use with the use of color-coded diamonds on UH-1s by the unit during Vietnam, when it carried the designation of 101st Aviation Battalion. Although helmet markings are commonly worn by units throughout the Army, The Institute of Heraldry has confirmed they are not authorized by the Army's uniform regulations.

== Lineages of the 1st and 2nd Battalions ==
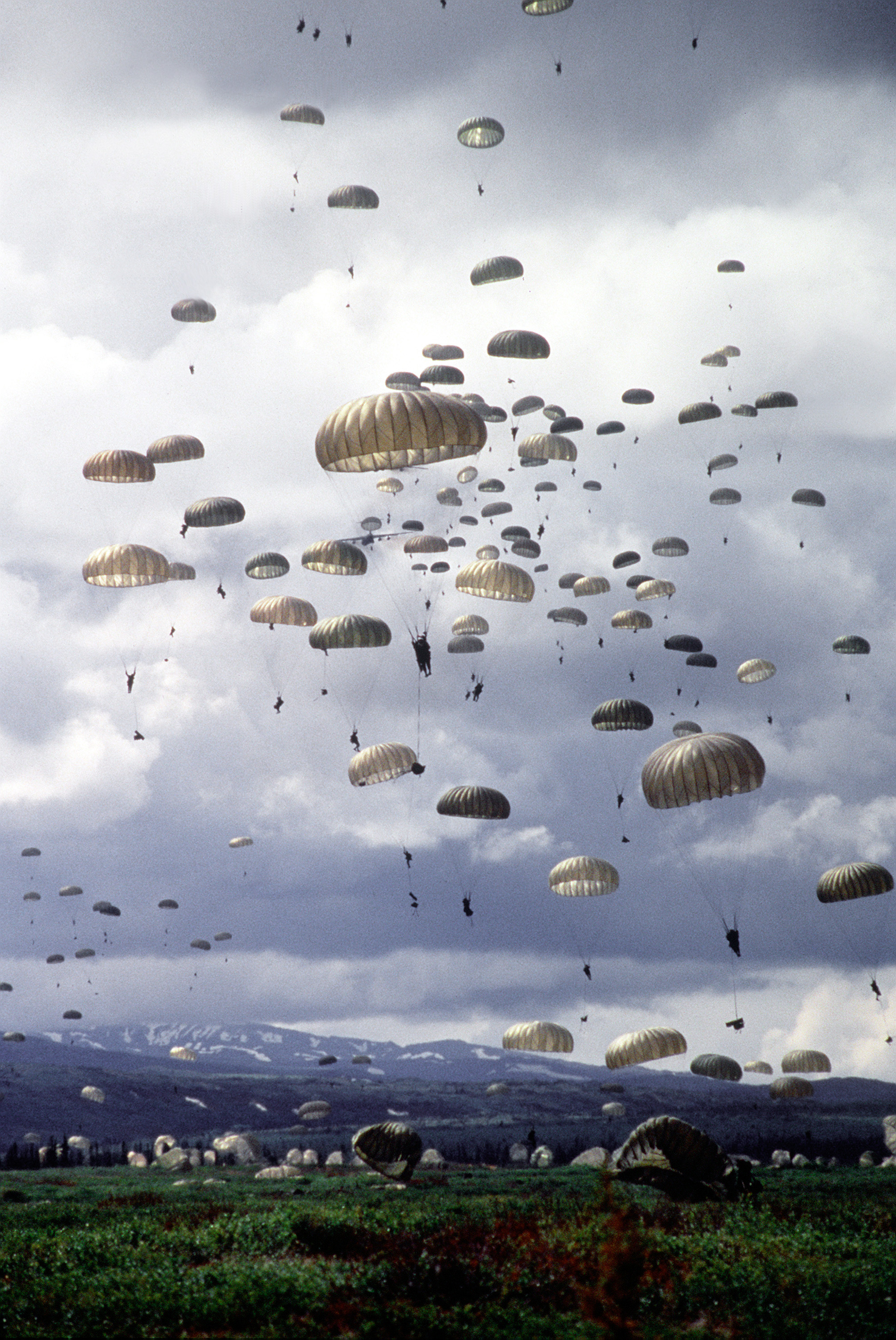
The 501st jumps in Alaska.

- Activated 15 November 1942 at Camp Toccoa, GA (101st Airborne Division)
- Disbanded 20 August 1945 at Camp Toccoa, GA (ahead of inactivation of 101st Airborne in November 1945)
- Activated 1 August 1946 at Fort Benning, GA
- Inactivated on 23 November 1948 at Fort Benning, GA
- Active 1951–1956 at Camp Breckinridge, KY and Fort Jackson, SC, as a non-Airborne training unit
- Moved to Fort Campbell, KY in spring 1956. (Pentomic concept)
- Redesignated on 25 April 1957 as a parent regiment under the Combat Arms Regimental System.
- On 1 September 1957 Company A, 501st Parachute Infantry Regiment was re-designated as HHC, 1st Airborne Battle Group, 501st Infantry and assigned to the 101st Airborne Division; Company B, 501st Parachute Infantry Regiment was re-designated as HHC (Headquarters and Headquarters Company), 2nd Airborne Battle Group, 501st Infantry and assigned to the 82nd Airborne Division.
- 1 February 1964, 2nd ABG, 501st INF was reorganized and re-designated as 2nd Bn, 501st INF, relieved from assignment from 82nd Airborne and assigned to 101st Airborne Division (administrative move of unit colors only).
- 2nd Bn, 501st INF inactivated on 31 July 1972. (Part of Post Vietnam Reorganization)
- 1st Bn, 501st INF inactivated on 5 June 1984 at Fort Campbell, KY under the U.S. Army Regimental System.
- 1st Bn, 501st Inf activated 1 October 1989 at Fort Richardson, AK under the U.S. Army Regimental System. Assigned to the 6th Infantry Division.
- Assigned to the 4th Brigade Combat Team (Airborne), 25th Infantry Division, on 14 July 2005.
- Assigned to the 2nd Brigade (Airborne), 11th Airborne Division on 6 June 2022.
- 2nd Bn, 501st INF activated 15 October 2013 and assigned to the 1st Brigade Combat Team, 82nd Airborne Division.

== Honors ==
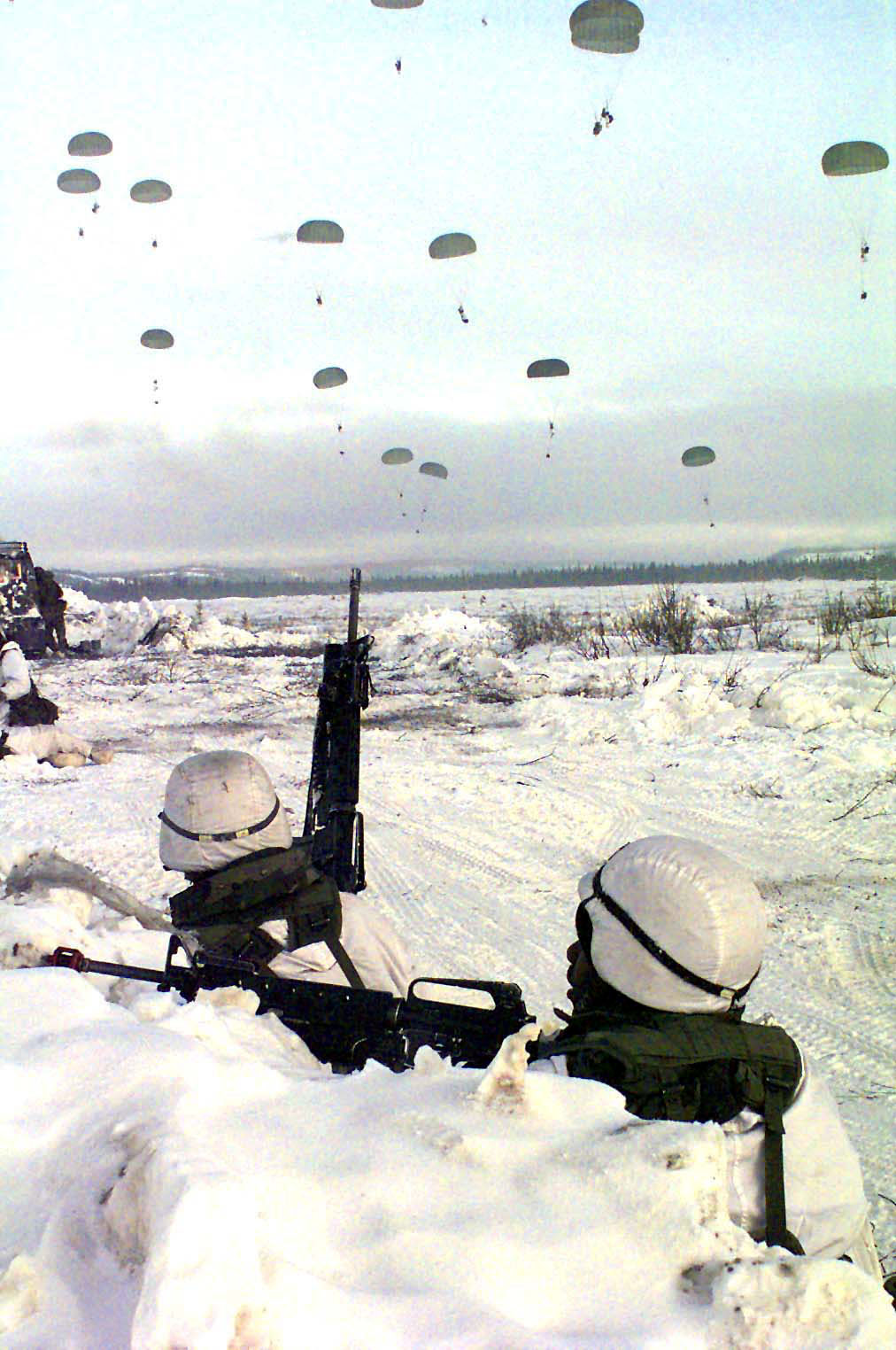
1st/501st PIR soldiers parachute from a C-130 over Donnelly Drop Zone on Ft. Greely, AK.

=== Campaign participation ===
- World War II:
1. Normandy (with arrowhead)
2. Operation Market Garden
3. Ardennes-Alsace
4. Central Europe
- Vietnam:
1. Defense
2. Counteroffensive
3. Counteroffensive, Phase II
4. Counteroffensive, Phase III
5. Tet Counteroffensive
6. Counteroffensive, Phase IV
7. Counteroffensive, Phase V
8. Counteroffensive, Phase VI
9. Tet 69/Counteroffensive; Summer-Fall 1969
10. Winter-Spring 1970
11. Sanctuary Counteroffensive
12. Counteroffensive, Phase VII
- Operation Enduring Freedom:
1. Consolidation, Phase I
2. Consolidation, Phase III
3. Transition, Phase I
4. Transition, Phase II (OFS)
- Operation Iraqi Freedom:
1. National Resolution
2. Iraqi Surge

=== Decorations ===
Device	Award	Year	Conflict	Location	Notes
	Presidential Unit Citation	1944	World War II	Normandy, France	501st PIR – Operation Overlord
	Presidential Unit Citation	1944	World War II	Bastogne, Belgium	501st PIR – Siege of Bastogne
	Presidential Unit Citation	1969	Vietnam War	Dong Ap Bia, Vietnam	2–501st Infantry – Battle of Hamburger Hill
	Valorous Unit Award	1969	Vietnam War	Vietnam	C/2-501st Infantry – 17 April – 7 May 1969
	Valorous Unit Award	2006–07	Iraq War (2003–2011)	Anbar Province	B/1-501st PIR – Operation Iraqi Freedom – Dec. 2006 – June 2007
	Valorous Unit Award	2007	Iraq War (2003–2011)	Iraq	1–501st PIR (less company B) – Operation Iraqi Freedom – May – Sept. 2007
	Valorous Unit Award	2007	Iraq War (2003–2011)	Babil Province	B/1-501st PIR – Operation Iraqi Freedom – June – Sept. 2007
	Valorous Unit Award	2009–10	Afghanistan War (2001–2021)	Paktika Province	1–501st PIR – Operation Enduring Freedom – Mar. 2009 – Feb. 2010
	Meritorious Unit Commendation	2017–18	Afghanistan War (2001–2021)	Afghanistan	2–501st PIR – Operation Freedom's Sentinel – July 2017 to Mar. 2018
	Meritorious Unit Commendation	2017–18	Afghanistan War (2001–2021)	Afghanistan	A/1-501st PIR – Operation Freedom's Sentinel – Nov. 2017 to June 2018
	Meritorious Unit Commendation	2017–18	Afghanistan War (2001–2021)	Afghanistan	1–501st PIR – Operation Freedom's Sentinel – Sept. 2017 to May 2018
	French Croix de Guerre with Palm	1944	World War II	Normandy, France	501st PIR – Operation Overlord
	Belgian Croix de Guerre with Palm	1944	World War II	Bastogne, Belgium	501st PIR – Siege of Bastogne
	Republic of Vietnam Gallantry Cross Unit Citation with Palm	1968	Vietnam War	Vietnam	1–501st & 2–501st PIR – 19 April – 15 August 1968
	Republic of Vietnam Gallantry Cross Unit Citation with Palm	1968–69	Vietnam War	Vietnam	1–501st & 2–501st PIR – 15 August 1968 – 14 May 1969
	Republic of Vietnam Gallantry Cross Unit Citation with Palm	1971	Vietnam War	Vietnam	1–501st & 2–501st (less company A) PIR – 1 March – 9 Oct. 1971
	Republic of Vietnam Gallantry Cross Unit Citation with Palm	1971	Vietnam War	Vietnam	1–501st & 2–501st PIR – 18 April – 31 Aug. 1971 & 6–19 Sept. 1971
	Republic of Vietnam Civil Actions Unit Citation First Class with Palm	1968–70	Vietnam War	Vietnam	1–501st & 2–501st PIR – 18 March 1968 – 2 May 1970

=== Notable Geronimo ===
- Private First Class Vincent Speranza, 3-501st published NUTS!: A 101st Airborne Division Machine Gunner at Bastogne
- CPT Joe Hooper, Medal of Honor recipient with D/2–501st (Airborne) for actions on February 21, 1968, outside Huế, Republic of Vietnam.
- SP4 Santiago J. Erevia, Medal of Honor recipient with C/1-501st Infantry (Airborne) for actions on May 21, 1969, near Tam Kỳ, Republic of Vietnam.
- SSG Clifford C. Sims, posthumous Medal of Honor recipient with D/2–501st Infantry (Airborne) for actions on February 21, 1968, near Huế, Republic of Vietnam.
- MG Francis L. Sampson, Distinguished Service Cross (United States) recipient as Catholic regimental chaplain with Headquarters, 501st PIR. Prominent for his role in the return of Sgt. Fritz Niland during the Normandy campaign.
- Cpt. Hugo S. Sims, Jr., Distinguished Service Cross (United States) and Silver Star recipient, originally with A/1-501st PIR and later Regimental S2, Headquarters, 501st PIR. Led the "Incredible Patrol" on October 30, 1944, in the Netherlands, capturing 32 German prisoners of war. Later served South Carolina politician and representative to the United States House of Representatives.
- CPT Richard J. Flaherty, Silver Star and Bronze Star Medal with Valor recipient, as Platoon Leader with B, C, D and E companies, 1-501st Infantry (Airborne). Flaherty received a height waiver allowing entry into the Army at 4 feet, 9 inches, making him the shortest Officer in Army history. Later served with 3rd and 10th Special Forces Groups. Subject of the book "The Giant Killer" by David Yuzuk.
- SP4 Robert Patrick Gunton, Jr., Bronze Star Medal with Valor recipient as Radio Telephone Operator for C/2-501st Infantry (Airborne) at the Battle of Fire Support Base Ripcord. Later known for multiple acting roles including Warden Norton in The Shawshank Redemption.
- Maj. Sam Gibbons, Headquarters, 501st PIR and later Florida politician and representative to the United States House of Representatives.
- 2nd Lt. Edward A. Allworth, son of a Medal of Honor recipient Maj. Edward Allworth and noted historian and linguist. Allworth served with the 2/501st PIR from Normandy to the end of the war in Europe.
- Sgt. Fritz Niland, H/3-501st PIR whose real-life story as one of the Niland brothers inspired the movie Saving Private Ryan.
