= Don Pratt =

United States Army general (1892–1944)

Don Forrester Pratt
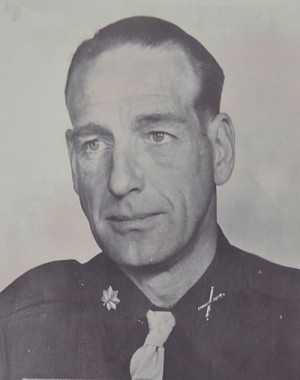
- Born: July 12, 1892; Brookfield, Missouri, U.S.
- Died: June 6, 1944 (aged 51); Normandy, France
- Burial place: Arlington National Cemetery, Virginia, U.S.
- Military career
- Allegiance: United States
- Branch: United States Army
- Service years: 1917–1944
- Rank: Brigadier General
- Unit: Infantry Branch
- Conflicts: World War I; World War II; Operation Overlord †; American airborne landings in Normandy
- Awards: Purple Heart

Don Forrester Pratt (July 12, 1892 – June 6, 1944) was a brigadier general in the United States Army who served as assistant division commander (ADC) of the 101st Airborne Division during World War II. He was the highest-ranking Allied officer killed on D-Day.

== Biography ==
=== Early life ===
Born in Brookfield, Missouri, Pratt graduated from the University of Wisconsin-Madison in 1917. He received his commission as a second lieutenant after enlisting in the army during World War I, in August 1917.

From 1932 to 1936, he served as adjutant, 15th Infantry Regiment, in Tientsin, China. Next he was an instructor, for the infantry school at Fort Benning, Georgia, from 1937 until 1941, an experience "which prepared him for senior responsibilities at a time when the US Army was rapidly expanding its ranks".

Upon America's entry into World War II in December 1941, he was named chief-of-staff, 43rd Infantry Division, 1941-1942. His next assignment, in August 1942, was as the deputy commander, for the newly formed 101st Airborne Division, at the rank of brigadier general. Pratt was named the assistant division commander on September 15, 1943, under Major General William C. Lee. Stationed near the town of Newbury, England, on February 9, 1944, Lee suffered a major heart attack. Pratt thought that he would be chosen to succeed Lee, but Maxwell D. Taylor, then 82nd Airborne artillery commander, was given command of the 101st Airborne.

=== Invasion of Normandy ===
For the American airborne landings as part of the Invasion of Normandy, General Pratt, originally assigned to command the division train and reserve troops of the 101st to be landed by sea, received permission to land with a force of CG-4A Waco gliders assigned to Mission Chicago, the first American glider assault during the invasion.

Pratt flew as a passenger (along with his aide 1st Lt. Lee John May) in the lead glider, a quickly substituted CG-4A with a bolt-on Griswold nose protection device painted to represent The Fighting Falcon. The original "Fighting Falcon" was moved to position #45 in the flight serial. It was a CG-4A paid for by War Bond funds raised by Greenville, Michigan students who intended to raise the $17,000 cost of one glider, but ended up raising over $72,000. Piloted by Lieutenant Colonel Mike Murphy, senior glider pilot of IX Troop Carrier Command, and Second Lieutenant John M. Butler, the #1 glider came down into its designated landing zone, LZ "E", 2 miles (3.2 km) west of Sainte-Marie-du-Mont, Manche, Normandy, between 0345 and 0400 hours on June 6, 1944.

The Waco glider landed successfully but when Lieutenant Colonel Murphy applied the brakes, the wet tall grass caused the glider to skid without significant slowing, and it overran the landing zone, crashing into a hedgerow line of 40-foot-tall (12 m) poplar trees. Lieutenant Colonel Murphy suffered severe injuries with both legs broken, one a compound fracture. A tree limb impaled through the co-pilot side of the cockpit, killing Butler. Pratt, sitting in the Jeep, died from a cervical fracture of the spine, resulting from whiplash. The Jeep was not chained but was tied down with nylon rope, and did not break loose. Lieutenant May was riding on the jump seat behind the Jeep and survived the crash.

Pratt was first buried, wrapped in a parachute, in Normandy until the end of the war, then re-interred at Arlington National Cemetery (Section 11) July 26, 1948. He was succeeded by Gerald J. Higgins, making Higgins the youngest general officer in the Ground Forces during World War II.

== Fictionalization ==
The incident was fictionalized as a scene in the film Saving Private Ryan, with Pratt becoming Brigadier General Amend.
