= Joe Hooper (Medal of Honor) =

United States Army Medal of Honor recipient (1938–1979)

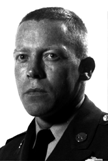
- Born: August 8, 1938; Piedmont, South Carolina, U.S.
- Died: May 6, 1979 (aged 40); Louisville, Kentucky, U.S.
- Burial place: Arlington National Cemetery
- Military career
- Allegiance: United States
- Branch: United States Navy (1956–1959); United States Army (1960–1978)
- Service years: 1956–1978
- Rank: Captain
- Units: 2nd Battalion, 501st Airborne Infantry, 101st Airborne Division
- Conflicts: Vietnam War (WIA)
- Awards: Medal of Honor; Silver Star (2); Bronze Star Medal (6); Purple Heart (8); Air Medal (5); Army Commendation Medal (2)

Joe Ronnie Hooper (August 8, 1938 – May 6, 1979) was an American who served in both the United States Navy and United States Army where he finished his career as a captain. He earned the Medal of Honor while serving as an army sergeant on February 21, 1968, during the Vietnam War. He was one of the most decorated U.S. soldiers of the war and was wounded in action eight times.

== Early life and education ==
Hooper was born on August 8, 1938, in Piedmont, South Carolina. His family moved when he was a child to Moses Lake, Washington where he attended Moses Lake High School.

== Military career ==
=== United States Navy ===
Hooper enlisted in the United States Navy in December 1956. After graduation from boot camp at San Diego, California he served as an airman aboard USS Wasp and USS Hancock. He was honorably discharged in July 1959, shortly after being advanced to petty officer third class.

=== United States Army ===
Hooper enlisted in the United States Army in May 1960 as a private first class, and attended Basic Training at Fort Ord, California. After graduation, he volunteered for Airborne School at Fort Benning, Georgia. He was assigned to Company C, 1st Airborne Battle Group, 325th Infantry, 82nd Airborne Division at Fort Bragg, North Carolina, and was promoted to corporal during this assignment. He served a tour of duty in South Korea with the 20th Infantry in October 1961. Shortly after arriving, he was promoted to sergeant and was made a squad leader.

Hooper left Korea in November 1963. He was assigned to the 2nd Armored Division at Fort Hood, Texas for a year as a squad leader, then became a squad leader with Company D, 2nd Battalion (Airborne), 502nd Infantry, 101st Airborne Division at Fort Campbell, Kentucky. He was promoted to staff sergeant in September 1966, and volunteered for service in South Vietnam. Instead, he was assigned as a platoon sergeant in Panama with the 3rd Battalion (Airborne), 508th Infantry, 193rd Infantry Brigade first with HQ Company and later with Company B.

Hooper could not stay out of trouble, and suffered several Article 15 hearings, and was reduced to the rank of corporal in July 1967. He was promoted once again to sergeant in October 1967, and was assigned to Company D, 2nd Battalion (Airborne), 501st Airborne Infantry, 101st Airborne Division at Fort Campbell. He deployed with the division to South Vietnam in December as a squad leader. During his tour of duty with Delta Company (Delta Raiders), 2nd Battalion (Airborne), 501st Airborne Infantry, he was recommended for the Medal of Honor for his heroic actions on February 21, 1968, during the Battle of Huế.

Hooper returned from South Vietnam, and was discharged in June 1968. He re-enlisted in the Army in September 1968, and served as a public relations specialist. On March 7, 1969, he was presented the Medal of Honor by President Richard Nixon during a ceremony in the White House. From July 1969 to August 1970, he served as a platoon sergeant with the 3rd Battalion, 5th Infantry, 193rd Infantry Brigade in Panama.

Hooper deployed to Vietnam for a second tour of duty in 1970. From April to June 1970, he served as a Pathfinder with the 101st Aviation Group, 101st Airborne Division (Airmobile). From June to December 1970, he served as a platoon sergeant with Company A, 2nd Battalion, 327th Infantry, 101st Airborne Division (Airmobile). In December 1970, he received a direct commission to second lieutenant. He served as a platoon leader with Company A, 2nd Battalion, 501st Infantry, 101st Airborne Division (Airmobile) until April 1971.

Upon his return to the United States, Hooper attended the Infantry Officer Basic Course at Fort Benning, and was assigned as an instructor at Fort Polk, Louisiana. Despite wanting to serve twenty years in the Army, Hooper was made to retire in February 1974 as a first lieutenant, mainly because he only completed a handful of college courses beyond his GED. As soon as he was released from active duty, he joined a unit of the Army Reserve's 12th Special Forces Group (Airborne) in Washington as a Company Executive Officer.

In February 1976, Hooper transferred to the 104th Division (Training), also based in Washington. He was promoted to captain in March 1977. He attended drills intermittently, and was separated from the service in September 1978.

For his service in Vietnam, the U.S. Army also awarded Hooper two Silver Stars, six Bronze Stars, eight Purple Hearts, the Presidential Unit Citation, the Vietnam Service Medal with six campaign stars, and the Combat Infantryman Badge. He is credited with 115 enemy killed in ground combat, 22 of which occurred on February 21, 1968. He became one of the most-decorated soldiers in the Vietnam War, and was one of three soldiers wounded in action eight times during the war.

== Later life and death ==
According to rumors, he was distressed by the anti-war politics of the time, and compensated with excessive drinking which contributed to his death. He died of a cerebral hemorrhage in Louisville, Kentucky on May 6, 1979, at the age of 40.

Hooper is buried at Arlington National Cemetery in Section 46, adjacent to the Memorial Amphitheater.

== Military awards ==
Hooper's military decorations and awards include:

Combat Infantryman Badge
| Medal of Honor | | Silver Star w/ 1 bronze oak leaf cluster |
| Bronze Star w/ Valor device and 1 silver oak leaf cluster | Purple Heart w/ 1 silver and 2 bronze oak leaf clusters | Air Medal w/ 4 bronze oak leaf clusters |
| Army Commendation Medal w/ Valor device and 1 bronze oak leaf cluster | Army Good Conduct Medal w/ 3 bronze Good conduct loops | Navy Good Conduct Medal |
| National Defense Service Medal | Armed Forces Expeditionary Medal | Vietnam Service Medal w/ 1 silver and 1 bronze campaign stars |
| Vietnam Cross of Gallantry w/ Palm | Republic of Vietnam Campaign Medal | Navy Pistol Marksmanship Ribbon w/ "E" Device |

Army Presidential Unit Citation
| Vietnam Presidential Unit Citation | Republic of Vietnam Gallantry Cross Unit Citation | Republic of Vietnam Civil Actions Unit Citation |

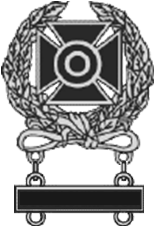

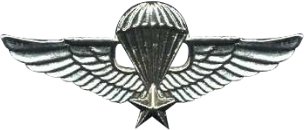

| Master Parachutist Badge | Expert Marksmanship Badge w/ 1 weapon bar | Vietnam Parachutist Badge |

=== Medal of Honor citation ===
Medal of Honor

Rank and organization: Staff Sergeant, U.S. Army, Company D, 2d Battalion (Airborne), 501st Infantry, 101st Airborne Division. Place and date: Near Huế, Republic of Vietnam, February 21, 1968. Entered service at: Los Angeles, Calif. Born: August 8, 1938, Piedmont, S.C.

For conspicuous gallantry and intrepidity in action at the risk of his life above and beyond the call of duty. Staff Sergeant (then Sgt.) Hooper, U.S. Army, distinguished himself while serving as squad leader with Company D. Company D was assaulting a heavily defended enemy position along a river bank when it encountered a withering hail of fire from rockets, machine guns and automatic weapons. S/Sgt. Hooper rallied several men and stormed across the river, overrunning several bunkers on the opposite shore. Thus inspired, the rest of the company moved to the attack. With utter disregard for his own safety, he moved out under the intense fire again and pulled back the wounded, moving them to safety. During this act S/Sgt. Hooper was seriously wounded, but he refused medical aid and returned to his men. With the relentless enemy fire disrupting the attack, he single-handedly stormed 3 enemy bunkers, destroying them with hand grenade and rifle fire, and shot 2 enemy soldiers who had attacked and wounded the Chaplain. Leading his men forward in a sweep of the area, S/Sgt. Hooper destroyed 3 buildings housing enemy riflemen. At this point he was attacked by a North Vietnamese officer whom he fatally wounded with his bayonet. Finding his men under heavy fire from a house to the front, he proceeded alone to the building, killing its occupants with rifle fire and grenades. By now his initial body wound had been compounded by grenade fragments, yet despite the multiple wounds and loss of blood, he continued to lead his men against the intense enemy fire. As his squad reached the final line of enemy resistance, it received devastating fire from 4 bunkers in line on its left flank. S/Sgt. Hooper gathered several hand grenades and raced down a small trench which ran the length of the bunker line, tossing grenades into each bunker as he passed by, killing all but 2 of the occupants. With these positions destroyed, he concentrated on the last bunkers facing his men, destroying the first with an incendiary grenade and neutralizing 2 more by rifle fire. He then raced across an open field, still under enemy fire, to rescue a wounded man who was trapped in a trench. Upon reaching the man, he was faced by an armed enemy soldier whom he killed with a pistol. Moving his comrade to safety and returning to his men, he neutralized the final pocket of enemy resistance by fatally wounding 3 North Vietnamese officers with rifle fire. S/Sgt. Hooper then established a final line and reorganized his men, not accepting treatment until this was accomplished and not consenting to evacuation until the following morning. His supreme valor, inspiring leadership and heroic self-sacrifice were directly responsible for the company's success and provided a lasting example in personal courage for every man on the field. S/Sgt. Hooper's actions were in keeping with the highest traditions of the military service and reflect great credit upon himself and the U.S. Army.

== See also ==
- List of Medal of Honor recipients
- List of Medal of Honor recipients for the Vietnam War
