= Geronimo (1939 film) =

Film by Paul Sloane

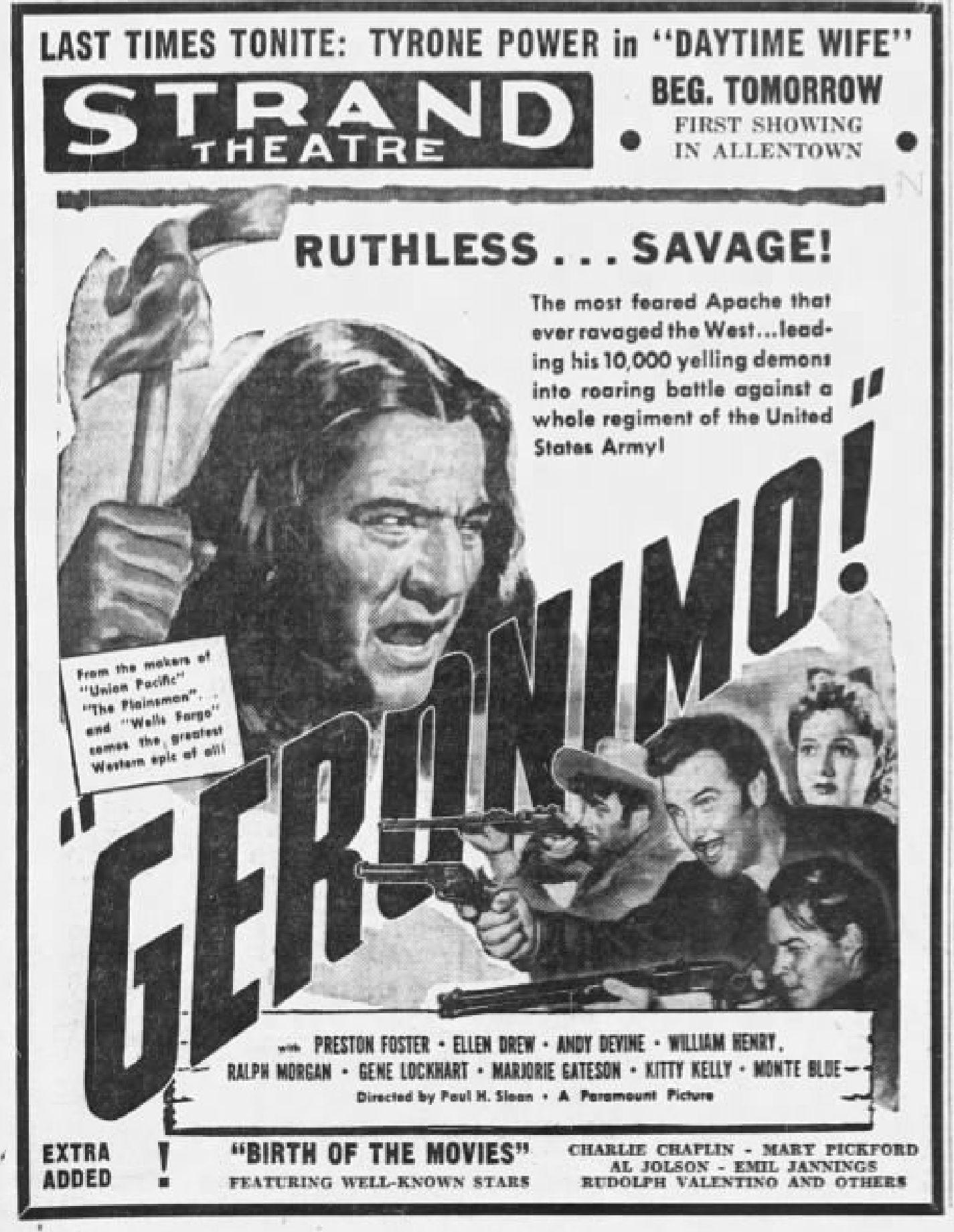
- Newspaper advertisement
- Directed by: Paul Sloane (as Paul H. Slone)
- Screenplay by: Paul Sloane (as Paul H. Slone)
- Starring: Preston Foster; Ellen Drew; Andy Devine
- Cinematography: Henry Sharp
- Edited by: John F. Link Sr.
- Music by: Gerard Carbonara; John Leipold
- Production company: Paramount Pictures
- Distributed by: Paramount Pictures
- Release dates: November 26, 1939 (Phoenix, Arizona)
- Running time: 89 minutes
- Country: United States
- Language: English

Geronimo (full title: Geronimo: The Story of a Great Enemy) is a 1939 American Western film starring Chief Thundercloud as Geronimo, the famous leader of Apache warriors who fought against American colonizers. It was directed by Paul Sloane. This is the first film depiction of Geronimo's life.

== Plot ==
The army's effort to capture Apache chief Geronimo, who is leading a band of warriors on a rampage of raiding and murder, is hampered by a feud between two officers—who are father and son.

== Cast ==
- Chief Thundercloud as Geronimo
- Preston Foster as Captain Bill Starrett
- Ellen Drew as Alice Hamilton
- Andy Devine as Sneezer
- Gene Lockhart as Gillespie
- William Henry as Lt. John Steele Jr.
- Ralph Morgan as Gen. Steele
- Pierre Watkin as Colonel White
- Marjorie Gateson as Mrs. Steele

== Accolades ==
The film is recognized by American Film Institute in these lists:

- 2003: AFI's 100 Years...100 Heroes & Villains:
  - Geronimo – Nominated Hero

== In popular culture ==
The exclamation Geronimo!, shouted when jumping from a great height, may have entered the English language through the 1939 film. During World War II, the film was shown to a group of paratroopers at Fort Benning, Georgia, who afterwards began to shout Geronimo! at the moment of jumping from the airplane.
