= Richard J. Flaherty =

United States Army soldier

- Born: November 28, 1945; Stamford, Connecticut, U.S.
- Died: May 9, 2015 (aged 69); Aventura, Florida, U.S.
- Burial place: Forest Memorial Park, Milton, West Virginia
- Relatives: Joseph Patrick Flaherty (grandfather); Bridget Smythe (grandmother)
- Military career
- Allegiance: United States
- Branch: United States Army
- Service years: 1967 – 1971
- Rank: Captain
- Nickname: "The Giant Killer"
- Units: 101st Airborne Division; 3rd Special Forces Group; 10th Special Forces Group
- Vietnam War: Tet Offensive
- Awards: Silver Star; Bronze Star (2); Purple Heart (2)
- Other work: Informant for Bureau of Alcohol, Tobacco, Firearms and Explosives; Central Intelligence Agency
- Website: https://www.facebook.com/TheGiantKIllerDocumentary/

Richard James Flaherty (November 28, 1945 – May 9, 2015) was a United States Army captain in the Vietnam War and a CIA agent afterwards. Once the smallest serviceman in American history (standing at 4 feet 9 inches (1.45 m)) and inspired to undermine size-prejudice, Flaherty was nicknamed "The Giant Killer".

== Early life ==
Flaherty was born November 28, 1945, in Stamford, Connecticut, where his maternal lineage would eventually contribute to a dwarfism diagnosis. As his mother was unfamiliar with her own Rh-negative blood-type, the attending Stamford Connecticut Regional Hospital staff were at some disadvantage to provide a blue-baby birth protocol. Flaherty's growth was affected. Facing life as a vulnerable outlier, Flaherty would eventually develop both confidence and athleticism through martial arts' practice.

== Service career ==
Flaherty was promoted to 2nd lieutenant after attending Infantry Officer Candidate School on August 31, 1967.

In 1968, in support of the Vietnam War Lieutenant Flaherty was assigned to the 101st Airborne Division, his initial tour to Vietnam where he served as a Platoon Leader and Recon Platoon Leader with companies B, C, D, and E.

During the January, 1968 Tet Offensive Flaherty participated in the fierce defense of Hue City, earning a Silver Star, two Bronze Stars, and two Purple Hearts.

After this tour Lieutenant Flaherty returned to the United States to attend Special Forces Officer Course at Fort Bragg. Upon graduation he was assigned to the 3rd Special Forces Group (Airborne) as a Special Forces Operations Detachment A (SFODA) Commander in Company A of the 3rd SFG in Thailand. Later that year, he was reassigned to the 10th Special Forces Group at Fort Devens. He served as an SFODA commander in companies A and B.

In 1971, Captain Flaherty left the Army.

== Later life ==
After being discharged, Flaherty did private and military contract work in Rhodesia and Angola in Africa. The Central Intelligence Agency recruited him in the late 1970s due to his knowledge of military intelligence. The primary focus of his time in the CIA was supplying the Nicaraguan Contras in Nicaragua. His stint with the CIA came to an end when he was arrested for possessing silencers.

After being removed from the CIA, Flaherty helped catch a smuggling ring at Fort Bragg, North Carolina, and worked undercover for the Bureau of Alcohol, Tobacco, Firearms and Explosives as an informant.

Flaherty was killed on May 9, 2015, in a hit and run. Fifteen years before Flaherty's death, he was befriended by Miami Police officer David Yuzuk after Flaherty became homeless. Just ten days before Flaherty's death, Flaherty told Yuzuk his story. After Flaherty's death, Yuzuk went to look into his history and uncovered troves of information from Flaherty's storage unit, such as his passport with stamps from Cambodia, Venezuela, Iraq and Jordan. Flaherty was buried at Forest Memorial Park cemetery in Milton, West Virginia.

== Documentary film ==
David Yuzuk directed, co-produced and co-wrote a biographical documentary film about the life of Flaherty, The Giant Killer, which was released in 2017. It has a rating of 7.4 on IMDb.

== Awards and decorations ==
Personal decorations
Silver Star
Bronze Star Medal
Purple Heart
Air Medal
National Defense Service Medal
Vietnam Service Medal
Vietnamese Gallantry Cross
Vietnam Campaign Medal

Other accoutrements
Combat Infantryman Badge
Master Parachutist Badge
