= Camp Toccoa =

Training camp in Georgia during World War II

- Stephens County, near Toccoa, Georgia, U.S.
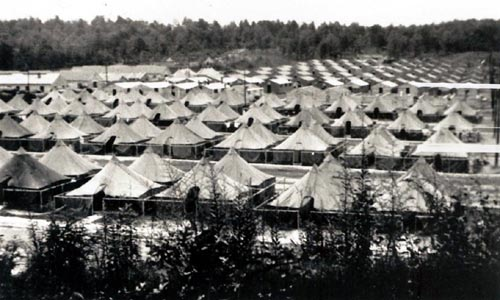
- Camp Toccoa in 1942

Site information
- Type: Military training base
- Controlled by: United States Army

Location
- Location in the United States Location in Georgia
- Coordinates: 34.5504°N 83.3973°W

Site history
- Built: 1940
- In use: 1941 – ca. 1946

Camp Toccoa (formerly Camp Toombs) was a basic training camp for United States Army paratroopers during World War II, located in northeastern Georgia, five miles (8 km) west-southwest of Toccoa. Among the units to train at the camp was the 506th Infantry Regiment. The regiment's Company E ("Easy Company") was portrayed in the 2001 HBO miniseries Band of Brothers. The camp site's approximate elevation is 1,150 feet (350 m) above sea level.

== Construction ==
The training camp known as Camp Toombs was conceived in 1938. The Georgia National Guard and the Works Projects Administration (WPA) began construction on 17 January 1940, with the site being dedicated on 14 December 1940. Initially it was known as Camp Toombs, after Confederate Civil War General Robert Toombs. During the national emergency preceding American involvement in World War II, the site was taken over by the War Department, and was intended to be returned to state control after the emergency passed.

== Wartime operations ==
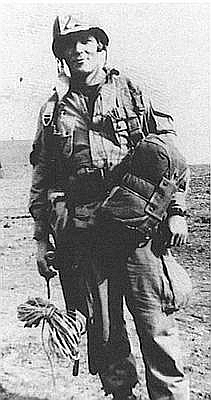
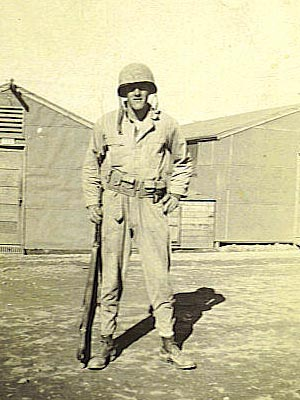
Richard Winters (left) and Albert Blithe (right), of E Company of the 506th Parachute Infantry Regiment, pictured here at Camp Toccoa, c. 1942.

Colonel Robert Sink, commander of the 506th Parachute Infantry Regiment, one of the first units to train there, did not like the name. He thought it would prompt superstitions among the arriving young recruits, who after traveling down Route 13 would pass the Toccoa Casket Company and arrive at Camp "Tombs". Sink persuaded the War Department to change the name to Camp Toccoa.

Permanent barracks only became available after the first trainees had begun to arrive. Jump training was initially done at the nearby Toccoa municipal airport. Following a training accident, the airport was considered to have a runway too short for safe C-39 and C-47 take off and landings. All further jump training was relocated to Fort Benning, Georgia. Camp Toccoa also lacked a rifle range, so trainees were marched thirty miles (50 km) to Clemson Agricultural College, a military school in South Carolina, to practice at the college's shooting range.

All paratrooper trainees were required to regularly run up Currahee Mountain (elev. 1,735 feet (529 m)), which overlooked Camp Toccoa. This arduous task was memorialized in the HBO series, Band of Brothers, with the shout "three miles (5 km) up, three miles down." Members of the 506th Parachute Infantry Regiment refer to themselves as "Currahees" (it is anglicized name derived from the Cherokee word gurahiyi, which may mean "standing alone"). Currahee Mountain is on the distinctive unit insignia of the 506th Parachute Infantry Regiment, in recognition of the peak's importance in the formation of the regiment.

Notable units that underwent training at Camp Toccoa were:

- 501st Parachute Infantry Regiment: attached to the 101st Airborne Division
- 506th Parachute Infantry Regiment: attached to the 101st Airborne Division
- 507th Parachute Infantry Regiment: attached to the 82nd Airborne Division and the 17th Airborne Division
- 511th Parachute Infantry Regiment: attached to the 11th Airborne Division
- 517th Parachute Infantry Regiment: attached to the 17th Airborne Division and the 13th Airborne Division
- 457th Parachute Field Artillery Battalion: attached to the 11th Airborne Division
- 295th Ordnance Heavy Maintenance Company: completed basic training at Camp Toccoa, from July 21, 1943, through November 24, 1943.
- 296th Ordnance Heavy Maintenance Company: completed basic training at Camp Toccoa, from July 21, 1943, through November 24, 1943

In 1943, comedian Bob Hope visited Camp Toccoa. He told the recruits, "You guys are so rugged, you look like Wheaties with legs." After the defeat of Japan, the War Department returned Camp Toccoa to state control in 1946.

== Post-war use ==
In the late 1940s, it became a satellite camp of Georgia State Prison, which primarily housed young offenders. However, after repeated escapes, the unit was moved in the 1950s to a new facility at Alto, Georgia. Part of the site was eventually occupied by a manufacturing company.

== Preservation ==
Just one WWII building remains: the training camp's PX.

In 2012, the Camp Toccoa at Currahee not-for-profit foundation was formed to celebrate the lives and contributions of the Airborne paratroopers who trained at Camp Toccoa. A plan was set forth to restore the facilities at the camp site.

The route run by paratrooper trainees is now the Colonel Robert F. Sink memorial trail, which follows Currahee Mountain Road from the site of former Camp Toccoa to the summit of Currahee Mountain. The start of the trail is marked by a commemorative plaque dedicating the trail to "Col. Bob" Sink from the Five-O-Sinks (506th Parachute Infantry Regiment Association). The trail is currently the venue for the Annual Currahee Challenge, a three- and six-mile race on the mountain that occurs in the fall.
