= Benjamin Harrison (major general) =

United States general (1928–2022)

Benjamin Leslie Harrison
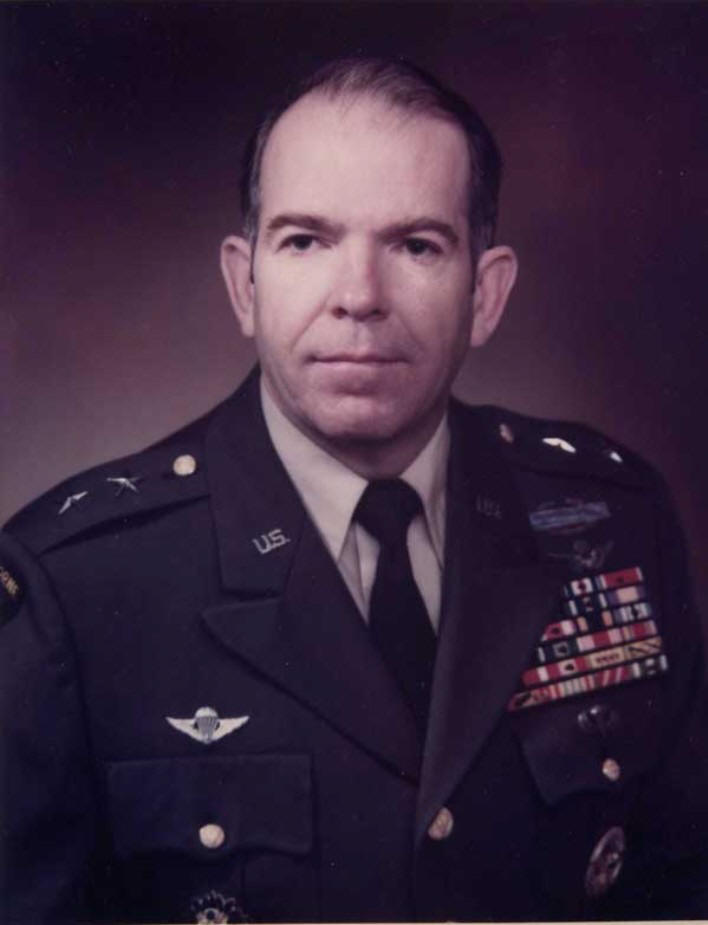
- Born: July 23, 1928; Trumann, Arkansas, U.S.
- Died: January 22, 2022 (aged 93)
- Military career
- Allegiance: United States of America
- Branch: United States Army
- Service years: 1946-1978
- Rank: Major general
- Conflicts: Vietnam War
- Awards: Distinguished Service Medal; Silver Star (2); Distinguished Flying Cross (2); Legion of Merit (2); Soldier's Medal; Air Medal (40)

Benjamin Leslie Harrison (July 23, 1928 – January 22, 2022) was an officer in the United States Army who contributed to the tactics of modern airmobile warfare involving the integration of helicopters with infantry and armor forces for both rapid deployment and subsequent support. General Harrison was an early advocate, theorist and practitioner of these tactics, commonly referred to as "air assault." They are analogous to the revolutionary use of armor and air support with infantry in blitzkrieg warfare in early World War II, and are critical to modern military doctrine as practiced in Vietnam, Iraq and Afghanistan.

General Harrison developed basic principles and practices of "vertical envelopment" theory in the years following the Korean War to take advantage of the developments in rotary wing aircraft during the period between World War II and the Vietnam War. He was able to put those principles into practice in Vietnam, first as a combat aviation battalion commander and later as an infantry brigade commander in the 101st Airborne Division, one of the pioneer airmobile divisions, and expanded them as an advisor to commanding generals of the South Vietnamese 1st Division and the Vietnamese Airborne Division during Operation Lam Son 719.

== Early years and education ==
Benjamin Leslie Harrison was born one of two children of Dr. Ben L. Harrison, MD, and Ruth Blackshare Harrison in the rural community of Trumann, in the northeastern corner of Arkansas on July 23, 1928. Ben's father died in 1938 when Ben was 10. An excellent student, Ben was able to transfer to Arkansas State College while still a junior in high school. He subsequently transferred to the University of Mississippi as a sophomore in 1945.

Early in 1946, six months before his 18th birthday, he enlisted in the U.S. Army. He rose rapidly through the ranks, becoming a Regular Army sergeant first class at age 19. He completed airborne training as the enlisted honor graduate of the class. Upon completion of his enlistment, he returned to the University of Mississippi, obtaining his Bachelor of Arts degree there in 1951, majoring in psychology. He had remained in the enlisted Army Reserve, was commissioned a second lieutenant of Infantry as Distinguished Military Graduate in 1951 and volunteered for active duty to serve as a military personnel psychologist.

Harrison married Carolyn Algee, in September 1951. They had two children together.

In addition to his undergraduate degree, Harrison earned graduate degrees while studying off duty in the Army. He graduated with an MA in Counseling and Education Psychology from the University of Missouri at Kansas City in 1963; received an MBA from Auburn University in 1969, and attended the six-week Advanced Management Program at Harvard Business School in 1971. He also attended the U.S. Army Command and General Staff College, the Armed Forces Staff College and the Air War College.

== Military service ==
Early in his initial assignment as a Military Personnel Psychologist, Harrison requested transfer back to his original branch of service, the infantry. He was assigned to the 82nd Airborne Division's 325th Airborne Infantry Regiment where he was chosen to be aide de camp to Brig Gen A. S. Newman. Moving with General Newman as his aide to Fort Benning, he later was assigned to the Operations Department of the Infantry School and taught Tactics.

His subsequent assignments included the 5th Infantry Division in Germany which GYROSCOPE'd to Fort Ord, CA, where he commanded a rifle company. His B Co, 2nd Infantry Regiment, was selected by the Division Commander as the most outstanding company in the Division.

While a student in the Infantry Advanced Course at Fort Benning, he was selected for flight school and in April 1958 he received his flight wings and graduated at the head of his class (and was subsequently to graduate first in his class at instrument school). Following his training, he took command of the Aviation Detachment in the 2d Infantry Battalion Combat Team in Iceland and put his instrument training to almost daily use.

From Iceland, Captain Harrison was selected to attend the Command and General Staff College(CGSC). After graduation, he was assigned to the faculty of the CGSC.

On the recommendation of the U.S. Army Tactical Mobility Requirements Board, the former 11th Airborne Division was reactivated as the 11th Air Assault Division (Test) in the mid-1960s to become a light infantry division and the first of the major army units to explore and develop the airmobility concept. With Harrison's enthusiastic approval, his "stabilized" tour at CGSC was ended with a transfer to Ft Benning to become the chief evaluator of all Air Cavalry and Mohawk units during, contributing significantly to the development and testing of the air mobility concepts. At the conclusion of the evaluation period, the 11th was converted to the 1st Air Cavalry division and deployed to Vietnam.

After the Air Assault tests, Major Harrison was selected to attend the Armed Forces Staff College with subsequent assignment and promotion to lieutenant colonel, as the "ground guy" in the Southeast Asia Division of J-5, CINCPAC Headquarters, Hawaii. After six months in this joint assignment, Major General George P. Seneff, commanding officer of the 1st Aviation Brigade, USARV, requested Harrison's assignment to command a combat aviation battalion.

In Vietnam, Colonel Harrison was given command of the 10th Combat Aviation Battalion during his first tour of duty, in 1966–67. (He was the only officer to command a separate combat aviation battalion for a full year during the entire Vietnam War). Continuing his commitment to the airmobility concept in his leadership and training emphasis, the battalion's combat operations involved night operations and instrument flying. After Vietnam, he was assigned to the Office of the Secretary of Defense (OSD) in Robert McNamara's four-officer Training Division where he conducted a study of operational flight training for fighter pilots in the Navy, Air force and Marines. A one-year tour in OSD and then to the Air War College, promotion to colonel, and back to Washington as Chief of the Doctrine Division in the Office of the Assistant Chief of Staff for Force Development.

At the request of Maj Gen John Wright, commanding general of the 101st Airborne Division, and after only one year in the Pentagon, Harrison returned to Vietnam in 1970, where he commanded the 3d Brigade of the 101st Airborne Division (Airmobile).

The 101st was the only full-strength division in Vietnam at this time, although not at full Table of Organization and Equipment (TO&E) strength. As such and strategically located in the northern portion of South Vietnam near the DMZ, the A Shau Valley and Laos, the 101st was selected to conduct the only offensive campaign launched by General Creighton Abrams, COMUSMACV in 1970, with the mission of destroying as much of the stocks and bases of the North Vietnamese Army in this area as a "final" major assist to the Vietnamization of the war process as all US combat troops were withdrawing from Vietnam. The 3rd Brigade was selected to lead this offensive by establishing a base near the Ashau from which attacks could be launched. From the start of planning, the then brigade commander, Col Bill Bradley and his Operations Officer, Maj Tex Turner, requested significant augmentation of the brigade to operate in this area. None was provided. From the very beginning, this supposed offensive operation, turned into a defensive operation for the 3rd Brigade ending in a siege of Firebase Ripcord 1-23 Jul 1970 by the entire 324B Division, NVA, supported by 304B Division, NVA.

Col Harrison took command of the 3rd Brigade on 23 Jun and during the first 69 days of his command, the 3rd Bde conducted:

- 16 battalion sized combat air assaults to multiple landing zones.
- 15 battalion sized aerial extractions from multiple pickup zones.
- Several new Fire Support Bases were opened and a number of older bases were closed.

In an interview with Maj Gen Chu Phong Doi, Commander of the 324B Division in 2004 in Cao Bang, Vietnam, he admitted to then Maj Gen (Ret) Harrison that he had suffered the loss of eight of his nine infantry battalions. Thousands of his support troops were also lost.

American losses, though comparatively small in numbers, were heavy with 250 KIA from 12 March to 23 July. The battle was marked by bravery in combat with the award of five Distinguished Service Crosses and three awards of the Medal of Honor during this campaign to troopers and leaders of the 3rd Brigade.

After completion of his assignment with the 3rd Brigade, he became the Senior Advisor to the commanding general of the ARVN 1st Infantry Division, during the incursions into Laos for Operation Lam Son 719. He worked closely with Vietnamese combat commanders to develop airmobile skills and experience as the war transitioned to a totally Vietnamese struggle. In his two combat tours in Vietnam, Harrison flew hundreds of helicopter missions, accumulating a total of 1842 combat flying hours out of a total military flight history of over 5,000 hours.

Following that assignment, Harrison directed the (Triple Capacity) testing at Fort Hood, Texas which resulted in the demise of the TRICAP Division concept and the subsequent formation of the 6th Cavalry Brigade (Air Combat).

Upon promotion to brigadier general in July 1973, for three years he was the academic and administrative head of the Command and General Staff College. One of his lasting contributions at the college was to consolidate all Training and Doctrine Command (TRADOC) constructive simulations and create a family of technologically based realistic battle simulations from platoon through corps level.

From August 1976 to August 1977, Harrison was the Deputy Commanding General of Fort Rucker, Alabama and of the Army Aviation Center located there. He was supposed to become the commanding general, but Army Chief of Staff General Bernie Rogers and TRADOC Commander Gen Bill Depuy pulled him back to Washington to design and conduct a review of officer education and professional development. The one year (RETO) created the Combined Arms and Services Staff School (CAS3) and the system of Military Qualifications Standards for officers and soldiers and placed Branch Proponency (including MOS specifications) with the Commandants of the Branch Schools.

Major General Harrison retired from the US Army after 28 years of commissioned service as an infantryman, aviator and educator. Harrison's assignment at the time of his retirement was commander of the Soldier Support Center and Fort Benjamin Harrison, Indiana. In this position he directed studies on unit cohesion and decentralization of personnel management that have had a major impact on today's personnel policies and replacement system.

In 1982, the TRADOC commander asked Harrison, then retired, to be the senior aviator of a group of four officers tasked to review Army Aviation. This four-month study effort resulted in the creation of Aviation as a separate combat arms branch and the centralization of all aviation doctrine, materiel and training development at Fort Rucker.

== Post-military career ==
After his retirement from the Army, Harrison was president of a holding company with small manufacturing plants and real estate properties. He continued to do specialized command studies as a consultant on defense matters and leadership development. He was a certified trainer and adjunct staff member of the prestigious Center for Creative Leadership for 17 years. He and his partner, Dr. George Peabody, conducted 38 leader development programs for the CIA at the "Farm."

With his wife developing serious heart problems in 1995, he fully retired. He died on January 22, 2022, at the age of 93.

== Awards and honors ==
During his military career, General Harrison was awarded the Distinguished Service Medal, two awards of the Silver Star, two awards of the Distinguished Flying Cross, two awards of the Legion of Merit, the Soldier's Medal, forty awards of the Air Medal, the Combat Infantryman Badge and numerous other US and foreign decorations. For his contributions to military aviation he was selected as a member of the U.S. Army Aviation Hall of Fame in 1992, and is an inductee in the University of Mississippi Army ROTC Hall of Fame and Honorary Colonel of the Third Aviation Regiment. Harrison has been listed in Who's Who in America since 1981. He was elected National President of the Army Aviation Association of America, President of the Army Aviation Museum Foundation and chairman of the Board of Trustees of the Army Aviation Hall of Fame. He was awarded the General J.K. Davis Award, at the University of Mississippi for outstanding service in the defense of liberty as a member of the Armed Forces. In 2011, the Vietnamese-American community and the Thu Duc Fellowship (alumni group of the ARVN military academy) recognized him for his defense of Vietnam, and in 2012 he was designated a Distinguished Member of the Regiment by the 506th Airborne Infantry Regiment.

== Open publications ==
Harrison was a prolific writer on military doctrine and management. Among his writings are:

- "Awesome, Mean: Now What Do We Do with the APACHE", ARMY, January 1988
- "Five Keys to Becoming a Successful Manager", ARMY, September 1988
- "Which PLATOON?", movie review in various publications
- "Aviation: A Branch Decision Revisited", ARMY, January 1991
- "The A-10: A Gift the Army Can't Afford", ARMY, July 1991
- "AirLand Battle-Future and the Aviation Brigade", Army Aviation, July 31, 1991
- "From the Hills West of Hue: A Cautionary Tale", ARMY, July 1993
- "Leaders or Managers?", selected for publication by ARMY
- "Simulating the "New World Disorder" ARMY, August 1994
- "Vietnam and the Information Age" ARMY, July 1995
- "Changing the Division Structure – Ask the Right Questions First", ARMY, July 1997
- "Aviation: A Branch Decision Revisited-Again", ARMY, April 2000
- "Battle Tests Prove the APACHE Highly Survivable", ARMY Aviation, September 2003

In addition, he authored a significant number of restricted military readings and management studies.

Following the publication of Keith Nolen's account of the battle of FB Ripcord ("Ripcord: Screaming Eagles Under Siege, Vietnam 1970" by Keith W. Nolan, Presidio Press, 2000), General Harrison wrote a book of the battle from the North Vietnamese perspective entitled, "Hell On A Hill Top', published in November 2004. This book was based both on documents from each side of the Vietnam War and on information received on several trips to Vietnam to meet with former North Vietnamese military leaders, including his opposite number in the Ripcord Campaign.
