= Firebase Maureen =

Site information
- Type: Army

Location
- Coordinates: 16.381°N 107.269°E

Site history
- Built: 1970
- In use: 1970–71
- Battles/wars: Vietnam War

Garrison information
- Occupants: 101st Airborne Division

Firebase Maureen (also known as Hill 980) is a former U.S. Army firebase in A Sầu Valley southwest of Huế in central Vietnam.

== History ==
The base was established overlooking the A Sầu Valley, 32 km southwest of Huế.

The base was established by the 101st Airborne Division in May 1970 to support Operation Texas Star. On 7 May 1970 the base was defended by a platoon of the 1st Battalion, 506th Infantry when it was attacked by a People's Army of Vietnam (PAVN) force. Private Kenneth Michael Kays was awarded the Medal of Honor for his actions during the battle. In January 2025, former Pfc Kenneth J. David was awarded the Medal of Honor (upgraded from the Distinguished Service Cross) for his actions during the battle.

The base was reopened in April 1971 as part of Operation Lam Son 720.

== Current use ==
The base has reverted to jungle.
