= Battle of Fire Support Base Ripcord =

Battle of the Vietnam War (1970)

- Part of the Vietnam War
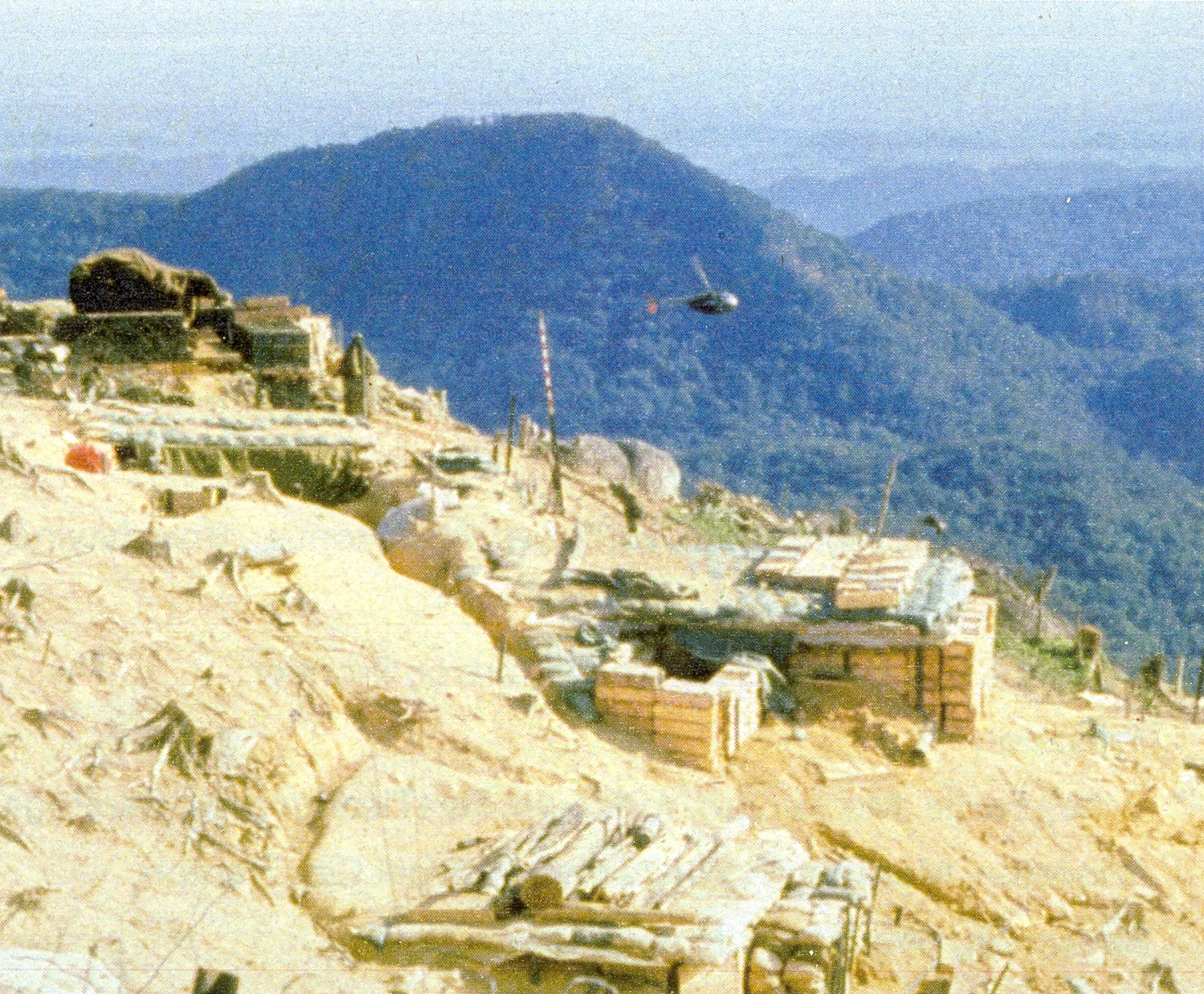
- Fire Support Base Ripcord in 1970
Date	1–23 July 1970 (3 weeks and 1 day)
Location	16°26′45.5″N 107°11′28″E; A Shau Valley, Thừa Thiên-Huế Province, South Vietnam - UTM Grid YD 343-194
Result	see Aftermath

Belligerents
North Vietnam	United States

Commanders and leaders
Chu Phương Đới (324B); Vũ Thế Đào (803rd); Nguyễn Hòa Bình (29th)	Col. Ben Harrison; Lt. Col. Andre Lucas †

Units involved
High Command: 324B Division; Siege at Ripcord: 803rd Regiment, 324B Division reinforced with: 2nd Battalion, 6th Regiment, Trị Thiên Army Group; 7B Sapper Battalion; 3 Fire Support Companies; At Co Pung and Hill 1078: 29th Regiment, 324B Division, reinforced with: 1 Fire Support Company	2nd Battalion, 506th Infantry Regiment

Casualties and losses
U.S. claim: 422 killed 6 captured	75 killed 8 aircraft destroyed

The Battle of Fire Support Base Ripcord was a 23-day battle between elements of the U.S. Army 101st Airborne Division and two reinforced divisions of the People's Army of Vietnam (PAVN) that took place from 1 to 23 July 1970. It was the last major confrontation between United States ground forces and the PAVN during the Vietnam War.

== Background ==
President Nixon began the withdrawal of troops from Vietnam in 1969. As the only full-strength division remaining in Vietnam in early 1970, the 101st Airborne Division was ordered to conduct the planned offensive Operation Texas Star near the A Shau Valley.

On 12 March 1970, the 3rd Brigade, 101st Airborne under the command of Colonel Ben Harrison, began rebuilding abandoned Fire Support Base Ripcord which relied, as the most remote bases at the time, on helicopter supply. The firebase was to be used to support Operation Chicago Peak, an offensive by the 101st Airborne to destroy PAVN supply bases in the A Shau Valley.

The PAVN 324B Division, having encountered soldiers of the U.S. 101st Airborne Division several times, especially the Battle of Hamburger Hill in May 1969, had become aware of the layered superiority of US firepower - air and artillery. Their plan to destroy FSB Ripcord, a key part of Operation Texas Star, took this superiority into account. Knowing the importance of the battle, 324B Division Commander Chu Phương Đới led the 1st Regiment (aka the 803rd Regiment) to scout the areas surrounding Ripcord and high points where U.S. forces often stationed or landed troops. The altitude and direction of helicopters entering and exiting Ripcord was observed; fortifications and retreat planning made; and efforts to arrange firepower to both attack and control, decreasing the mobility of U.S. forces prepared. The reliance on helicopters for moving and supplying troops was identified as a potential "Achilles heel" that the PAVN planned to exploit.

== Battle ==
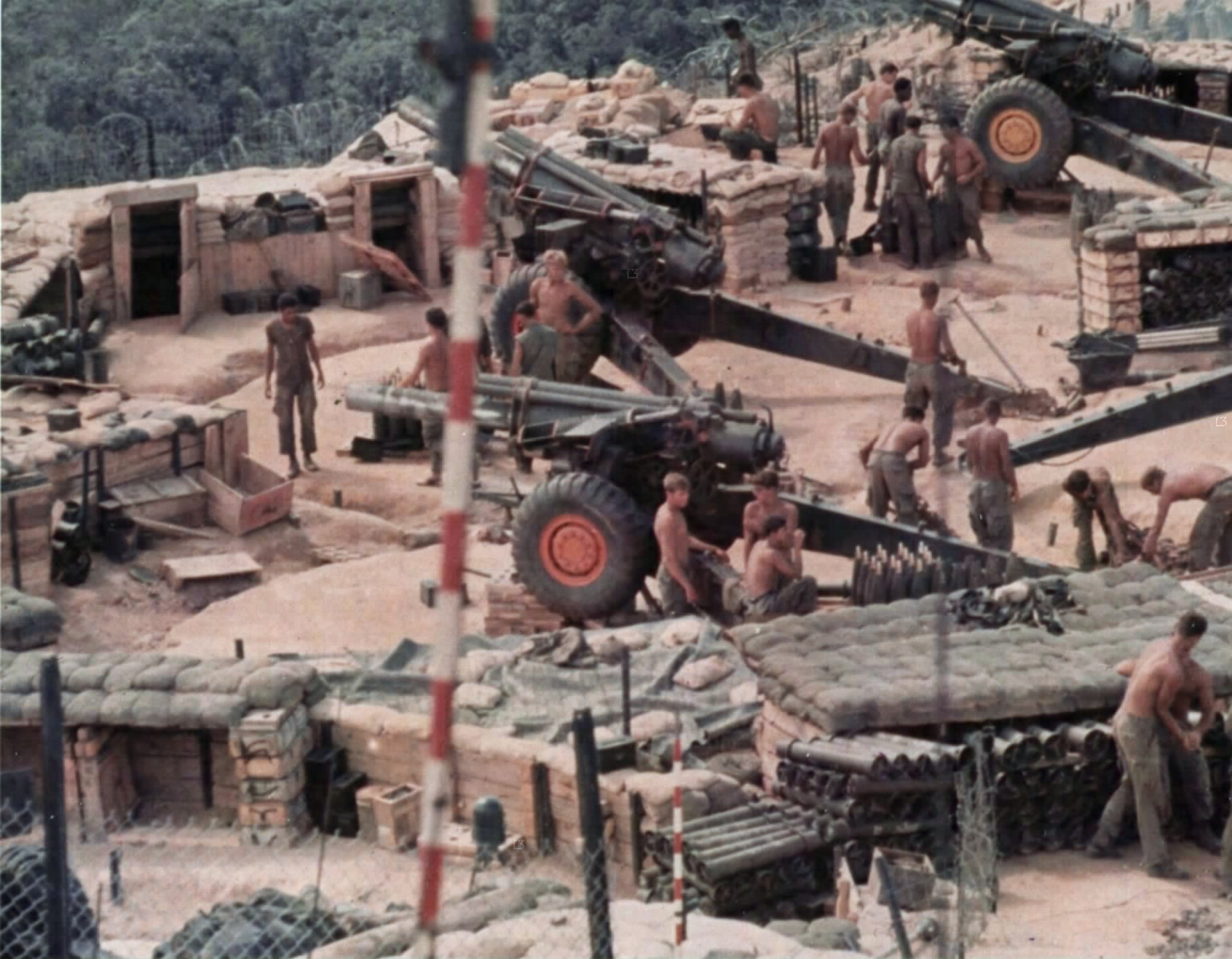
M114 155mm howitzer battery at Firebase Ripcord, 7 July 1970

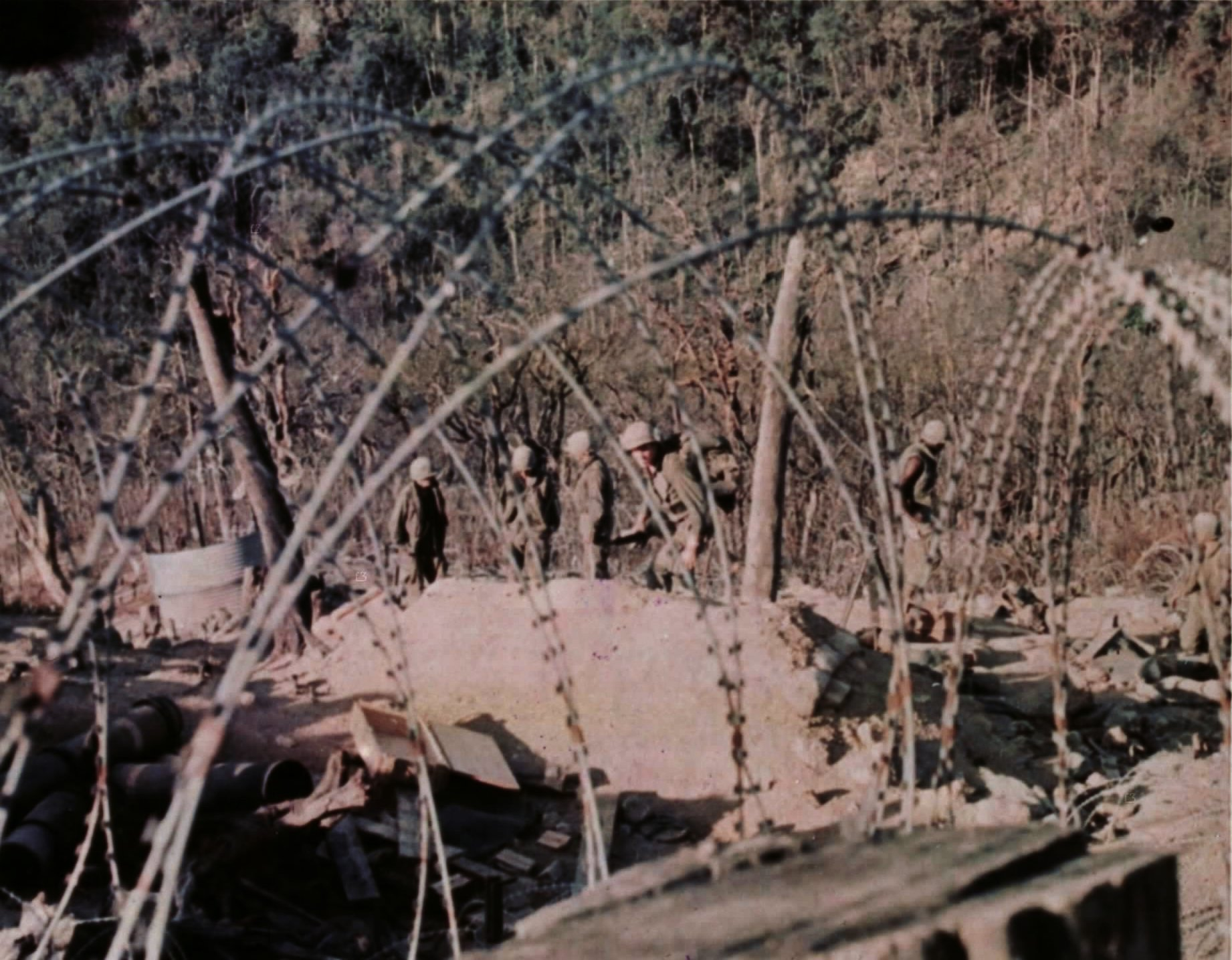
A patrol returns to the Firebase following a search for an enemy machine gun position which had been harassing resupply flights, 7 July 1970

On 1 July, elements of the 2nd Battalion, 506th Infantry Regiment received eight 82 mm rounds, an unknown number of 60 mm mortar rounds and ten 75 mm recoilless rounds fired by elements of the PAVN 803rd Regiment. Artillery was fired on the suspected enemy locations killing three PAVN. Nearby on the next day, the night defensive position of the 2/506th was attacked by elements of the 803rd Regiment using Rocket-propelled grenades (RPGs), small arms fire and satchel charges. PAVN losses were fifteen killed while U.S. losses were eight killed and one missing.

On 10 July at 11:25 B Company was subjected to a 38-round mixed 60 and 82 mm mortar barrage, killing two soldiers. On 18 July a CH-47C from the 159th Assault Helicopter Battalion was shot down by PAVN small arms fire. The aircraft crashed into the ammunition dump, killing four and destroying the helicopter, six M102 howitzers and 2,238 rounds of 105 mm howitzer ammunition. On 19 July elements of the PAVN 803rd Regiment again hit the base with mortar fire. On a search operation 20 July, D Company/1/506th, sustained mortar fire killing one. On 21 July at 07:10, D Company received a bombardment of 80 rounds of 82 mm mortar. The mortar and small arms fire continued until 16:15. D Company returned fire and with airstrikes and helicopter gunship fire held the PAVN off. D Company moved from the base and linked up with D Company 506th. Eight PAVN were killed while the U.S. lost one killed. At 06:50, B Company was hit by six 82 mm mortar rounds. At 10:04 the base received 10 more rounds and was hit again six and a half hours later, with a loss of four killed in the attacks. On 22 July at 13:00, A Company 2/506th, while on a search-and-clear operation received an enemy attack; airstrikes and artillery supported the company. When the contact broke at 19:30, the U.S. had lost 12 killed while PAVN losses were 61 killed.

Losses of U.S. forces were so great that officers began asking for volunteers from other units to go to Ripcord and reinforce the firebase. Finally, the U.S. command realized that the position was not defensible, and the decision was made to withdraw. On 23 July at 06:30 the PAVN again attacked the remaining elements who were evacuating the base. The 2nd Battalion returned the fire and aerial rocket artillery, gunships and airstrikes reinforced. When contact was broken, U.S. casualties were three killed (including the commanding officer Lieutenant Colonel Andre Lucas and the S-3). Ripcord was evacuated and abandoned on 23 July.

After the garrison withdrew from the base, B-52 bombers were sent in to carpet bomb the area.

== Aftermath ==
During the 23-day siege, 75 U.S. soldiers were killed at Ripcord. First Lieutenant Bob Kalsu was the only contemporaneously active pro athlete to be killed during the war. Andre Lucas was posthumously awarded the Medal of Honor.

Ben Harrison claimed that the PAVN losses at Ripcord crippled their offensive capability for two years, resulting in the delaying of their Easter Offensive from 1971 to 1972. Historians Shelby Stanton and Lewis Sorley, on the other hand, both state the PAVN achieved their objective by forcing the US to close Ripcord and withdraw.

== See also ==
- Firebase Henderson

=== Books ===
- "Ripcord: Screaming Eagles Under Siege, Vietnam 1970" by Keith W. Nolan, Presidio Press, 2000, ISBN 0-89141-642-0
- "The Price of Exit", by Tom Marshall, Ballantine Books, 1998. ISBN 0-8041-1715-2
- "The Sentinel and the Shooter", by Douglas W. Bonnot, 2010. ISBN 978-1-59594-418-4

=== Articles ===
- Rescue From FSB Ripcord, by Tom Marshall
- archived copy of Rescue From FSB Ripcord, by Tom Marshall

=== Video ===
- "Siege at Firebase Ripcord", War Stories with Oliver North, Fox News Productions, product # FOX25004600
