= Kenneth J. David =

Retired American soldier (born 1950)

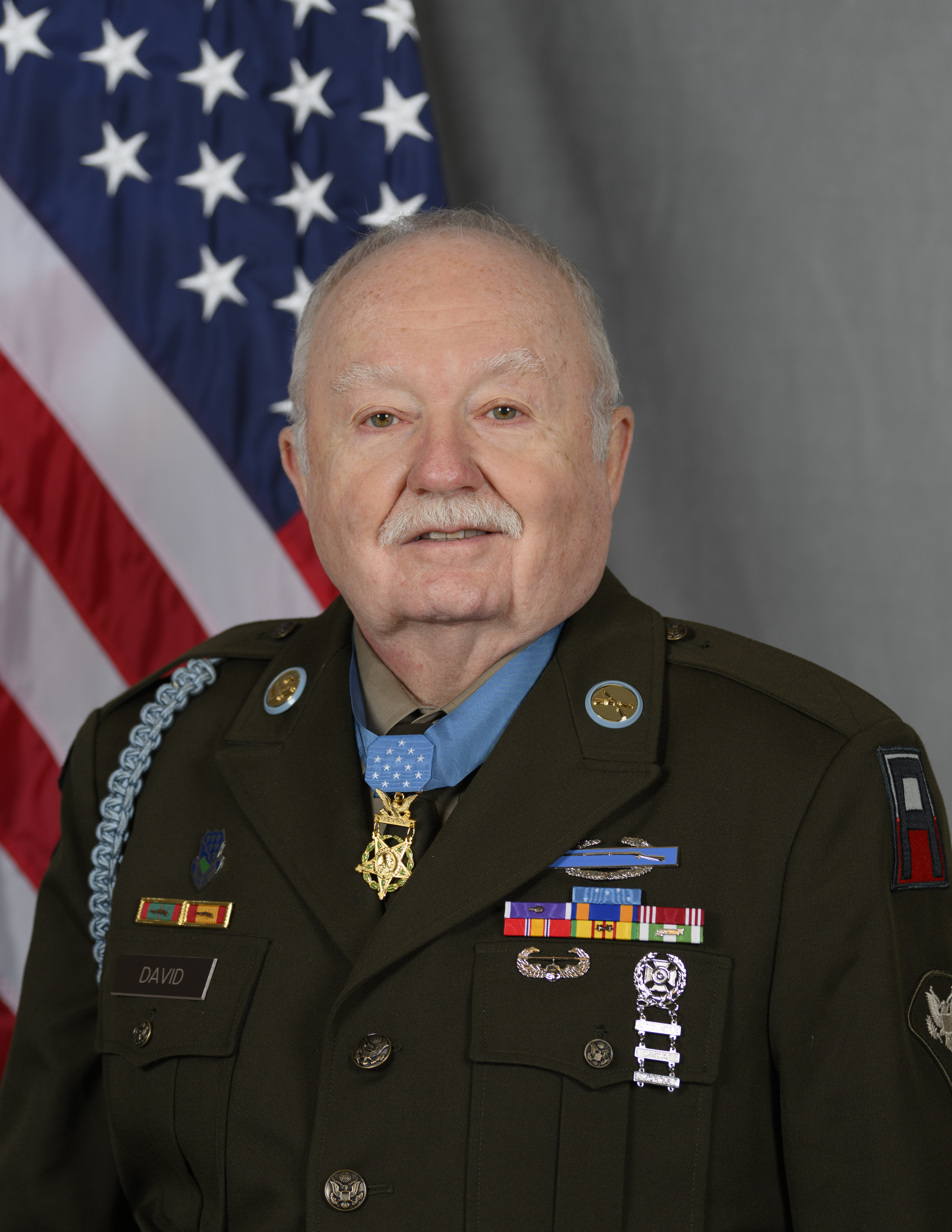
- Official U.S. Army portrait of Medal of Honor recipient Specialist Fourth Class Kenneth J. David
- Born: 21 January 1950 (age 76)
- Military career
- Allegiance: United States
- Branch: United States Army
- Service years: 1969–1970
- Rank: Specialist Four
- Conflicts: Vietnam War
- Awards: Medal of Honor

Kenneth J. David (born 21 January 1950) is a retired United States Army soldier who received the Medal of Honor on 3 January 2025 for his actions on 7 May 1970 during the Vietnam War.

== Early life ==
He was born on 21 January 1950, and grew up in Girard, Ohio. Active in the Boy Scouts, he achieved the rank of Eagle Scout.

== Military career ==
He was drafted and entered the Army in August, 1969 and received basic training at Fort Campbell, Kentucky, then advanced training at Fort Polk, Louisiana.

He was deployed to South Vietnam in January 1970, joining Company D, 1st Battalion, 506th Infantry Regiment, 101st Airborne Division.

After being wounded in action on 7 May 1970 at Firebase Maureen, he was moved to Valley Forge General Hospital in Pennsylvania. For his actions he was awarded the Distinguished Service Cross.

== Medal of Honor citation ==
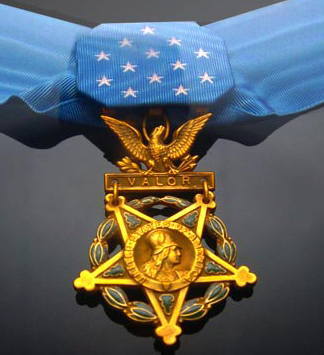

The President of the United States of America, authorized by Act of Congress March 3rd, 1863, has awarded in the name of Congress the Medal of Honor to

Then-Pfc. Kenneth J. David distinguished himself by acts of gallantry and intrepidity above and beyond the call of duty on May 7, 1970, while serving as a radio-telephone operator with Company D, 1st Battalion, 506th Infantry, 101st Airborne Division, near Fire Support Base Maureen, Thua Thien Province, Republic of Vietnam.

On this date, David's company came under an intense attack from a large hostile force. The enemy’s ferocious initial assault mortally wounded the company’s platoon leader and resulted in numerous other friendly casualties. Upon the initial assault and without hesitation, David handed his radio to his platoon sergeant and moved forward to the defensive perimeter, unleashing a barrage of automatic weapons fire on the enemy. From this location, David bitterly resisted all enemy efforts to overrun his position. Realizing the impact of the enemy assault on the wounded, who were being brought to the center of the perimeter, David – without regard for his own life – moved to a position outside of the perimeter while continuing to engage the enemy.

Each time the enemy attempted to concentrate its fire on the wounded inside the perimeter, David jumped from his position and yelled to draw enemy fire away from his injured comrades and back to himself. Refusing to withdraw in the face of the concentrated enemy fire now directed toward him, he continued to engage the enemy. Although wounded by an exploding satchel charge and running perilously low on ammunition, he tossed hand grenades toward the attackers to effectively counter their fire. The unit’s medic, realizing that David had been injured, moved to his position to provide aid, but David assured him that he was okay and continued to fight on.

David continued to draw enemy fire away from the incoming medevac helicopters, allowing the wounded to be safely evacuated. After allied reinforcements fought their way to his company’s position, David carried a wounded comrade to a sheltered position. He then returned to the contact area and continued to engage the enemy and provide covering fire for the wounded until the enemy broke contact and fled, at which point he too was medically evacuated. David’s conspicuous gallantry, extraordinary heroism and intrepidity, at the risk of his own life, were above and beyond the call of duty and reflect great credit upon himself, his unit and the United States Army.

== Honors and awards ==
David's personal decorations include the Distinguished Service Cross (upgraded to the Medal of Honor), the Purple Heart with 1st Oak Leaf Cluster, Air Medal, the Good Conduct Medal, the National Defense Service Medal, the Vietnam Service Medal with two Bronze Stars, the Vietnam Campaign Medal, the Combat Infantryman Badge, the Republic of Vietnam Civil Actions Honor Medal, the First Class Unit Citation Badge, the Republic of Vietnam Gallantry Cross with Palm, the Vietnam Civil Actions Unit Citation with Palm, Expert Marksmanship Badge.

== See also ==
- List of Medal of Honor recipients for the Vietnam War
