= Andre Lucas =

United States Army Medal of Honor recipient

Andre Cavaro Lucas
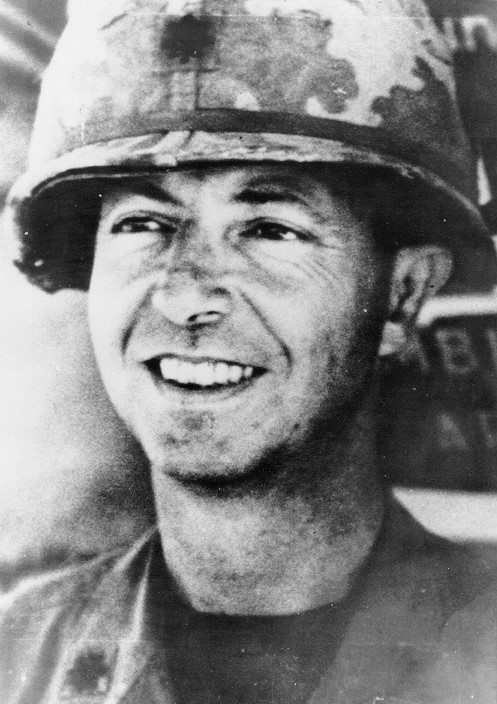
- Born: October 2, 1930; Washington, D.C., US
- Died: July 23, 1970 (aged 39); Fire Support Base Ripcord, Thừa Thiên Province, South Vietnam
- Burial place: West Point Cemetery (West Point, New York)
- Military career
- Allegiance: United States of America
- Branch: United States Army
- Service years: 1948–1970
- Rank: Lieutenant Colonel
- Commands: 2nd Battalion, 506th Infantry
- Conflicts: Vietnam War: Battle of Fire Support Base Ripcord †
- Awards: Medal of Honor; Silver Star (2); Purple Heart

Andre Cavaro Lucas (October 2, 1930 – July 23, 1970) was killed in action while serving as the commanding officer, 2nd Battalion, 506th Infantry, 101st Airborne Division, United States Army, at Fire Support Base Ripcord in Thua Thien Province, South Vietnam. He received the Medal of Honor posthumously for extraordinary heroism during the last 23 days of his life.

== Early life and education ==
Lucas was born in Washington D.C. His father William was a career Army officer who had fought in France during World War I. His mother Suzanne had been born in France and she sent him to her home town there to receive his secondary education. Lucas enlisted in the Army on June 30, 1948 and was assigned to the same company in the 26th Infantry Regiment that his father had commanded during the World War I. He received an at-large presidential appointment to the United States Military Academy, graduating with a B.S. degree in 1954. After receiving his Army commission, he attended the Infantry, Ranger and Airborne Schools. Lucas later graduated from the Army Command and General Staff College at Fort Leavenworth in 1965 and L'École d'état-major (the French Staff Academy) in Paris in 1966.

== Medal of Honor citation ==
Rank and organization: Lieutenant Colonel, U.S. Army, 2d Battalion, 506th Infantry, 101st Airborne Division. place and date: Fire Support Base Ripcord, Republic of Vietnam, 1 to July 23, 1970. Entered service at: West Point, N.Y. Born: October 2, 1930, Washington D.C.

Citation:

Lt. Col. Lucas distinguished himself by extraordinary heroism while serving as the commanding officer of the 2d Battalion. Although the fire base was constantly subjected to heavy attacks by a numerically superior enemy force throughout this period, Lt. Col. Lucas, forsaking his own safety, performed numerous acts of extraordinary valor in directing the defense of the allied position. On 1 occasion, he flew in a helicopter at treetop level above an entrenched enemy directing the fire of 1 of his companies for over 3 hours. Even though his helicopter was heavily damaged by enemy fire, he remained in an exposed position until the company expended its supply of grenades. He then transferred to another helicopter, dropped critically needed grenades to the troops, and resumed his perilous mission of directing fire on the enemy. These courageous actions by Lt. Col. Lucas prevented the company from being encircled and destroyed by a larger enemy force. On another occasion, Lt. Col. Lucas attempted to rescue a crewman trapped in a burning helicopter. As the flames in the aircraft spread, and enemy fire became intense, Lt. Col. Lucas ordered all members of the rescue party to safety. Then, at great personal risk, he continued the rescue effort amid concentrated enemy mortar fire, intense heat, and exploding ammunition until the aircraft was completely engulfed in flames. Lt. Col. Lucas was mortally wounded while directing the successful withdrawal of his battalion from the fire base. His actions throughout this extended period inspired his men to heroic efforts, and were instrumental in saving the lives of many of his fellow soldiers while inflicting heavy casualties on the enemy. Lt. Col. Lucas' conspicuous gallantry and intrepidity in action, at the cost of his own life, were in keeping with the highest traditions of the military service and reflect great credit on him, his unit and the U.S. Army.

== In memory ==
- LTC Lucas' name can be found on the Vietnam Veterans Memorial ("The Wall") on Panel 08W – Row 046.
- The Andre Lucas Elementary School in Ft. Campbell, Kentucky is named in honor of LTC Lucas.
- A tribute to Lucas by his West Point classmate William E. Odom was published in TAPS, May/June 2005. Odom also dedicated his 1992 book On Internal War to Lucas.

== Personal ==
Lucas was the son of William Edward Lucas Jr. and Suzanne Provost. His father received a B.S. degree in mechanical engineering from the Massachusetts Institute of Technology in 1914. He was commissioned in 1916 and received three Silver Stars and two Purple Hearts for his World War I combat service. His parents were buried at Arlington National Cemetery.

Lucas married Madeleine Mae Miller, who was also fluent in French because of Swiss-French parentage. They had two sons. Lucas and his wife were interred at the West Point Cemetery.

== See also ==
- List of Medal of Honor recipients
- List of Medal of Honor recipients for the Vietnam War
- FSB Ripcord
