= Peter M. Guenette =

United States Army soldier

Peter Matthew Guenette
- Army Medal of Honor
- Born: January 4, 1948; Troy, New York, US
- Died: May 18, 1968 (aged 20); Quan Tan Uyen Province, Republic of Vietnam
- Burial place: Saint Johns Cemetery Troy, New York
- Military career
- Allegiance: United States
- Branch: United States Army
- Service years: 1967–1968
- Rank: Specialist Four
- Units: 506th Infantry Regiment, 101st Airborne Division (Airmobile)
- Conflicts: Vietnam War †
- Awards: Medal of Honor; Purple Heart

Peter Matthew Guenette (January 4, 1948 – May 18, 1968) was a United States Army soldier and a recipient of the United States military's highest decoration—the Medal of Honor—for his actions in the Vietnam War.

== Biography ==
Guenette joined the Army from Lansingburgh, New York in 1967, and by May 18, 1968, was serving as a specialist four in Company D, 2d Battalion (Airborne), 506th Infantry Regiment, 101st Airborne Division (Airmobile). During a firefight on that day, in Quan Tan Uyen Province, Republic of Vietnam, Guenette smothered the blast of a hand grenade with his body, sacrificing his life to protect those around him.

== Medal of Honor citation ==
Specialist Guenette's official Medal of Honor citation reads:

For conspicuous gallantry and intrepidity in action at the risk of his life above and beyond the call of duty. Sp4c. Guenette distinguished himself while serving as a machine gunner with Company D, during combat operations. While Sp4c. Guenette's platoon was sweeping a suspected enemy base camp, it came under light harassing fire from a well equipped and firmly entrenched squad of North Vietnamese Army regulars which was serving as a delaying force at the entrance to their base camp. As the platoon moved within 10 meters of the fortified positions, the enemy fire became intense. Sp4c. Guenette and his assistant gunner immediately began to provide a base of suppressive fire, ceasing momentarily to allow the assistant gunner time to throw a grenade into a bunker. Seconds later, an enemy grenade was thrown to Sp4c. Guenette's right flank. Realizing that the grenade would kill or wound at least 4 men and destroy the machine gun, he shouted a warning and smothered the grenade with his body, absorbing its blast. Through his actions, he prevented loss of life or injury to at least 3 men and enabled his comrades to maintain their fire superiority. By his gallantry at the cost of his life in keeping with the highest traditions of the military service, Sp4c. Guenette has reflected great credit on himself, his unit, and the U.S. Army.

== See also ==
- List of Medal of Honor recipients for the Vietnam War
