= Kenneth Michael Kays =

United States Army soldier

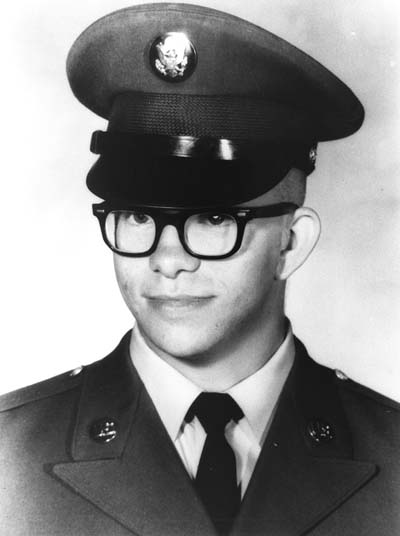
- Private First Class Kenneth Kays
- Born: September 22, 1949; Mount Vernon, Illinois, US
- Died: November 29, 1991 (aged 42); Fairfield, Illinois
- Burial place: Maple Hill Cemetery, Fairfield, Illinois
- Military career
- Allegiance: United States
- Branch: United States Army
- Service years: 1969–1971
- Rank: Private First Class
- Units: 506th Infantry Regiment, 101st Airborne Division
- Conflicts: Vietnam War
- Awards: Medal of Honor; Purple Heart; Combat Medical Badge

Kenneth Michael Kays (September 22, 1949 – November 29, 1991) was a United States Army soldier and a recipient of the United States military's highest decoration—the Medal of Honor—for his actions in the Vietnam War.

== Biography ==
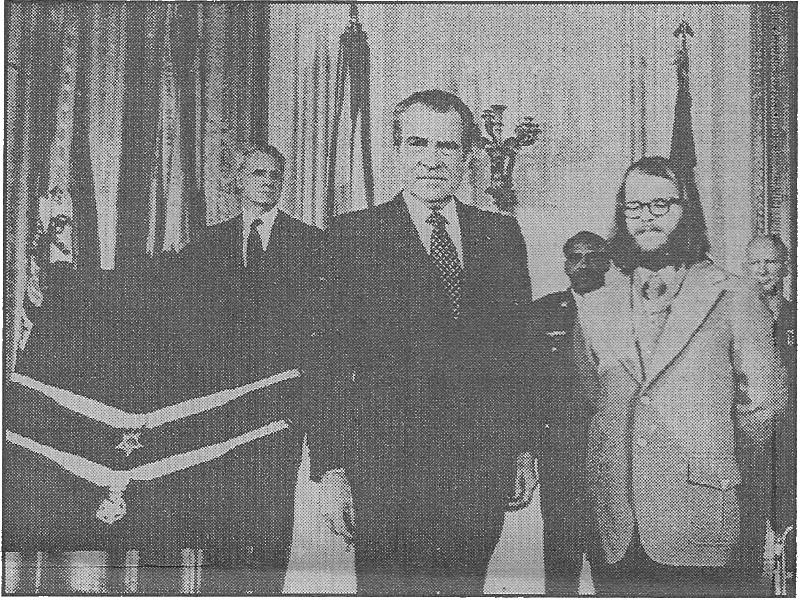
Kays receiving the Medal of Honor from U.S. President Richard Nixon

Denied status as a conscientious objector, Kays fled to Canada to avoid getting drafted for military service in Vietnam until the US Army guaranteed he would be able to serve as a medic. Kays joined the Army from Fairfield, Illinois in 1969, and by May 7, 1970, was serving as a private in the Headquarters Company of 1st Battalion, 506th Infantry Regiment, 101st Airborne Division. During a firefight on that day, in Thừa Thiên–Huế Province, Republic of Vietnam, Kays repeatedly exposed himself to enemy fire in order to treat wounded soldiers, even after losing his lower left leg to an explosion. He was subsequently promoted to private first class, and awarded the Medal of Honor for his actions in November 1973.

Kays left the Army while still a private first class. After returning to Illinois, Kays went on to struggle with drug addiction and mental health issues, due to the post-traumatic stress disorder that came from his service during the war. This culminated in Kays taking his own life at age 42 in 1991, after years of being troubled by these issues. He is buried in Maple Hill Cemetery, Fairfield, Illinois. In 2006, Randy K. Mills published a book, Troubled Hero: A Medal of Honor, Vietnam, and the War at Home, detailing Kays's life in Fairfield, Illinois through the Vietnam War. Mills compiled details from the battle at Fire Support Base Maureen, the battle in which Kays earned the Medal of Honor, from the histories as told by other soldiers who experienced it.

== Medal of Honor citation ==
Private Kays' official Medal of Honor citation reads:

For conspicuous gallantry intrepidity in action at the risk of his life above and beyond the call of duty. Pfc. (then Pvt.) Kays distinguished himself while serving as a medical aidman with Company D, 1st Battalion, 101st Airborne Division near Fire Support Base Maureen. A heavily armed force of enemy sappers and infantrymen assaulted Company D's night defensive position, wounding and killing a number of its members. Disregarding the intense enemy fire and ground assault, Pfc. Kays began moving toward the perimeter to assist his fallen comrades. In doing so he became the target of concentrated enemy fire and explosive charges, 1 of which severed the lower portion of his left leg. After applying a tourniquet to his leg, Pfc. Kays moved to the fire-swept perimeter, administered medical aid to 1 of the wounded, and helped move him to an area of relative safety. Despite his severe wound and excruciating pain, Pfc. Kays returned to the perimeter in search of other wounded men. He treated another wounded comrade, and, using his own body as a shield against enemy bullets and fragments, moved him to safety. Although weakened from a great loss of blood, Pfc. Kays resumed his heroic lifesaving efforts by moving beyond the company's perimeter into enemy held territory to treat a wounded American lying there. Only after his fellow wounded soldiers had been treated and evacuated did Pfc. Kays allow his own wounds to be treated. These courageous acts by Pfc. Kays resulted in the saving of numerous lives and inspired others in his company to repel the enemy. Pfc. Kays' heroism at the risk of his life are in keeping with the highest traditions of the service and reflect great credit on him, his unit, and the U.S. Army.

== See also ==
- List of Medal of Honor recipients
- List of Medal of Honor recipients for the Vietnam War
