= Robert Lee Wolverton =

American soldier (1914–1944)

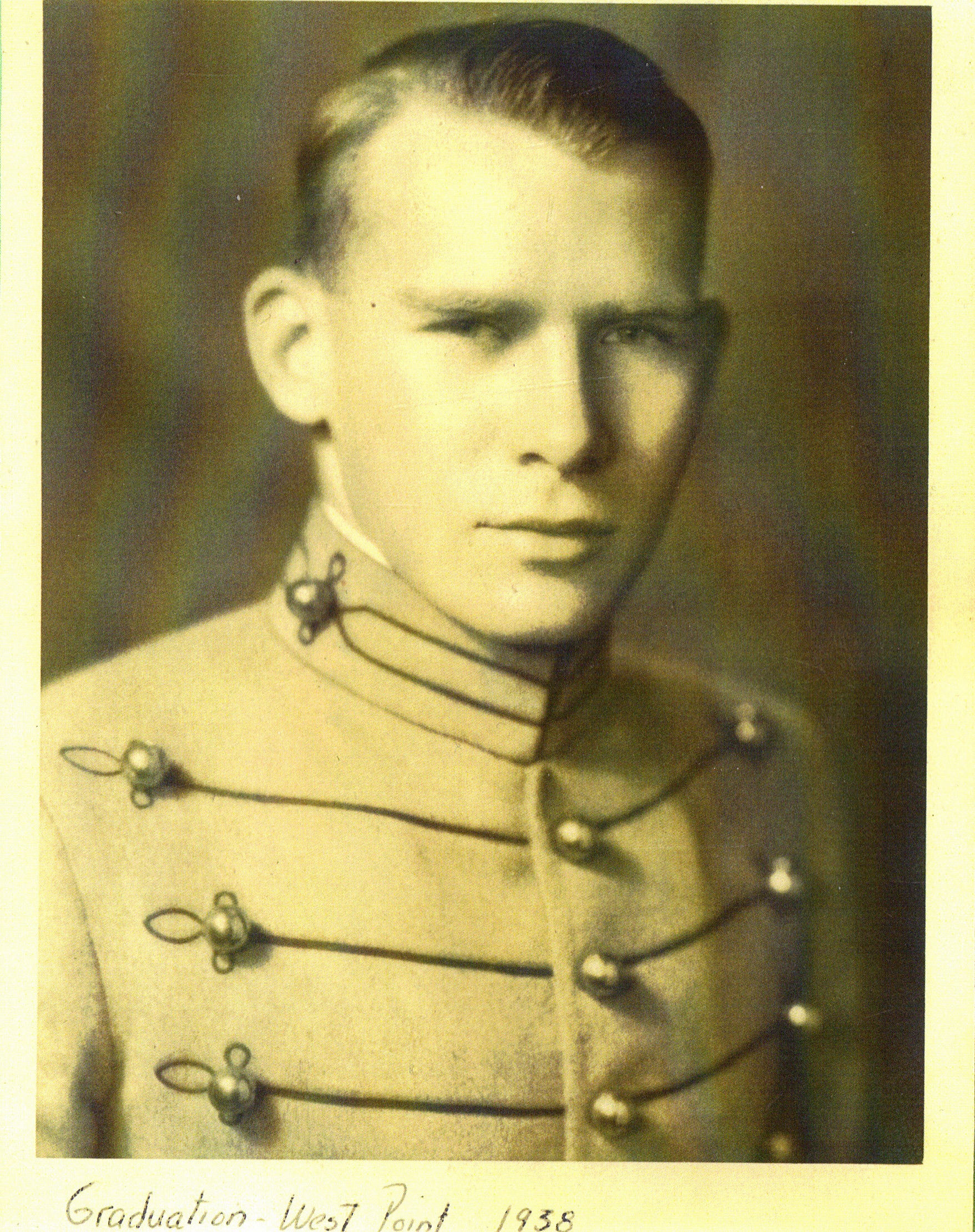
- Born: October 5, 1914; Elkins, West Virginia
- Died: June 6, 1944 (aged 29); Normandy, France
- Burial place: United States Military Academy Post Cemetery
- Military career
- Allegiance: United States
- Branch: United States Army
- Service years: 1938–1944
- Rank: Lieutenant Colonel
- Commands: 3rd Battalion, 506th Parachute Infantry, 101st Airborne Division
- Conflicts: World War II
- Awards: Legion of Merit; Purple Heart; European-African-Middle Eastern Campaign Medal; American Defense Medal; American Campaign Medal

Robert Lee "Bull" Wolverton (October 5, 1914 – June 6, 1944) was the commander of the American 3rd Battalion, 506th Parachute Infantry Regiment, 101st Airborne Division, from 1942 until his death at Saint-Côme-du-Mont, Normandy, on D-Day, June 6, 1944, during World War II.

Despite being killed before landing on French soil, Wolverton's legacy endured, particularly on the strength of a prayer spoken to the 750 men in his battalion hours before the D-Day parachute drop behind enemy lines.

Wolverton's words were cited by President Ronald Reagan in a 1984 speech from Normandy on the 40th anniversary of the invasion and recounted in numerous books and in Newsweek and Associated Press stories on a battalion reunion held in Kansas City on the first D-Day anniversary after the war.

Following is a recounting of the prayer:

The men were called together, and they stood in the orchard on either side of a low earthen mound which fenced the fields. Upon the earthen hedgerow stood Lt. Col. Robert L. Wolverton, commanding officer of 3rd battalion, 506th PIR. And the colonel said:

"Men, I am not a religious man and I don't know your feelings in this matter, but I am going to ask you to pray with me for the success of the mission before us. And while we pray, let us get on our knees and not look down but up with faces raised to the sky so that we can see God and ask His blessing in what we are about to do:

God almighty, in a few short hours we will be in battle with the enemy.
We do not join battle afraid.
We do not ask favors or indulgence but ask that,
if You will, use us as Your instrument for the right and an aid in returning peace to the world.
We do not know or seek what our fate will be.

We ask only this,
that if die we must,
that we die as men would die,
without complaining,
without pleading
and safe in the feeling that we have done our best for what we believed was right.

O Lord, protect our loved ones
and be near us in the fire ahead
and with us now as we pray to you."

All were silent for two minutes as the men were left, each with his individual thoughts. Then the colonel ordered, "Move out."

A few hours later, Robert Wolverton was killed by German machine gun fire in an orchard outside Saint-Come-du-Mont, Normandy, France. According to Ed Shames, Wolverton sustained "162 bullet holes and bayonet wounds" due to German troops using him as target practice. Of the paratroopers in his plane, five were killed (including Wolverton), seven were captured (some later escaped) and three successfully fought on.

== Background ==
Born in Elkins, West Virginia, Wolverton graduated from the United States Military Academy with a B.S. degree on June 14, 1938. His October 3, 1940, promotion to first lieutenant was made permanent on June 14, 1941. Wolverton was temporarily advanced to lieutenant colonel on January 18, 1943.

== Legacy ==
On June 9, 2014, a monument was dedicated to Wolverton at Saint-Côme-du-Mont, Normandy, France. After the war, his remains were returned to the United States and interred at the West Point Cemetery on October 11, 1948.
