= Donald Burgett =

American writer (1925–2017)

Donald Robert Burgett
- Born: April 5, 1925; Detroit, Michigan
- Died: March 23, 2017 (aged 91)
- Spouse: Twyla Burgett
- Children: 5
- Military career
- Allegiance: United States
- Branch: United States Army
- Service years: 1943–1945
- Units: Company A, 1st Battalion, 506th Parachute Infantry Regiment, 101st Airborne Division
- Conflicts: World War II: Operation Overlord; Operation Market-Garden; Battle of the Bulge

Donald R. Burgett (April 5, 1925 – March 23, 2017) was a writer and a former World War II paratrooper. He was among the Airborne troopers who landed in Normandy early on the morning of D-Day. He was a member of the 101st Airborne Division, ("The Screaming Eagles"), and the 506th Parachute Infantry Regiment. Burgett served in Company A, 1st Battalion, 506th PIR as both a rifleman and a machine-gunner.

== Life ==
Burgett was born in Detroit, Michigan, and grew up on the city's west side. In the opening paragraph of his memoir Currahee!, he mentioned his determination to follow his older brother Elmer, who had joined the Paratroops in 1942. Burgett volunteered to be called up as soon as he turned 18 the following year. On May 3, 1943, he reported to the Induction Center, where he officially volunteered for the Paratroops by signing a statement: "I do hereby volunteer to jump from a plane, while in flight, and land on the ground via parachute." He completed Basic Combat Training in Kansas, finished Airborne training at Fort Benning, Georgia, and joined the 101st at Camp Claiborne, Louisiana.

Burgett participated in Operation Overlord, parachuting into Normandy as a member of the 506th PIR, 101st Airborne. Burgett parachuted into the Netherlands, his second combat jump, as part of Operation Market-Garden with the 1st Allied Airborne Army, and fought for 72 days behind the German lines. After just a few weeks' rest, he was again sent into combat, this time at the Battle of the Bulge, where the 101st, along with Combat Command B of the U.S. 10th Armored Division and the all-African-American 969th Artillery Battalion (Cld)(155mm How Trac-D) held out against nine German armored divisions during the siege of Bastogne. Burgett went on to fight through Operation Nordwind, on into Germany to the Ruhr Valley, the Rhineland, and Bavaria, where he helped capture Hitler's mountain retreat in southern Germany. While in action with the 101st, Burgett was wounded three times and had his M1 rifle shot out of his hands at least twice.

Burgett lived in Howell, Michigan. He wrote four books and appeared in History Channel specials on World War II. Burgett died on March 23, 2017.

On Friday June 14, 2019, the Howell Post Office was renamed the "Sergeant Donald Burgett Post Office Building" in his honor. Howell mayor Nick Proctor also proclaimed June 14 as "Donald R. Burgett Day" in Howell.

== Bibliography ==
Burgett wrote several memoirs of his time serving in the United States Army during World War II. Some were based on unpublished accounts he wrote immediately after the war, while others were compiled in later years.

- Currahee!: A Screaming Eagle at Normandy, the story of Able Company of 506th Parachute Infantry Regiment
- The Road to Arnhem, a first hand account of Operation Market-Garden.
- Seven Roads to Hell (Bastogne and the Battle of the Bulge)
- Beyond the Rhine: A Screaming Eagle in Germany
