= Frank A. Herda =

United States Army soldier (1947–2023)

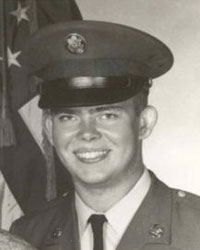
- Born: September 13, 1947; Cleveland, Ohio, U.S.
- Died: October 13, 2023 (aged 76); Cleveland, Ohio, U.S.
- Burial place: Brooklyn Heights Cemetery, Cleveland, Ohio, U.S.
- Military career
- Allegiance: United States
- Branch: United States Army
- Rank: Specialist Four
- Units: Company A, 1st Battalion (Airborne), 506th Infantry Regiment
- Conflicts: Vietnam War
- Awards: Medal of Honor; Purple Heart

Frank Aloysious Herda (September 13, 1947 – October 13, 2023) was a United States Army soldier and a recipient of the United States military's highest decoration, the Medal of Honor, for his actions in the Vietnam War.

== Military career ==
Herda joined the United States Army from his birth city of Cleveland, Ohio, and by June 29, 1968, was serving as a private first class in Company A, 1st Battalion (Airborne), 506th Infantry Regiment, 101st Airborne Division (Airmobile). During an enemy attack on that day, near Dak To in Kon Tum Province, Republic of Vietnam, Herda smothered the blast of an enemy-thrown hand grenade with his body to protect those around him. He survived the blast, although severely wounded, and was subsequently promoted to specialist four and awarded the Medal of Honor for his actions.

Herda published the sword and sorcery novel, The Cup of Death: Chronicles of the Dragons of the Magi, in 2007.

== Medal of Honor citation ==
Specialist Herda's official Medal of Honor citation reads:

For conspicuous gallantry and intrepidity in action at the risk of his life above and beyond the call of duty. Sp4c. Herda (then Pfc.) distinguished himself while serving as a grenadier with Company A. Company A was part of a battalion-size night defensive perimeter when a large enemy force initiated an attack on the friendly units. While other enemy elements provided diversionary fire and indirect weapons fire to the west, a sapper force of approximately 30 men armed with hand grenades and small charges attacked Company A's perimeter from the east. As the sappers were making a last, violent assault, 5 of them charged the position defended by Sp4c. Herda and 2 comrades, 1 of whom was wounded and lay helpless in the bottom of the foxhole. Sp4c. Herda fired at the aggressors until they were within 10 feet of his position and 1 of their grenades landed in the foxhole. He fired 1 last round from his grenade launcher, hitting 1 of the enemy soldiers in the head, and then, with no concern for his safety, Sp4c. Herda immediately covered the blast of the grenade with his body. The explosion wounded him grievously, but his selfless action prevented his 2 comrades from being seriously injured or killed and enabled the remaining defender to kill the other sappers. By his gallantry at the risk of his life in the highest traditions of the military service, Sp4c. Herda has reflected great credit on himself, his unit, and the U.S. Army.

== Death ==
Herda died in Cleveland, Ohio, on October 13, 2023, at the age of 76. He was buried in the Brooklyn Heights Cemetery, Cleveland, Ohio.

== See also ==
- List of Medal of Honor recipients for the Vietnam War
