= 506th Infantry Regiment =

506th Parachute Infantry Regiment (506th PIR) 506th Airborne Infantry Regiment (506th AIR) 506th Infantry Regiment (506th IR)
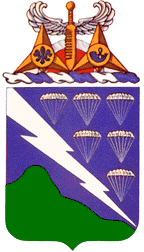
- Regiment's coat of arms
- Active: 1942–1945; 1948–1949; 1950–1953; 1956–1984; 1987–present
- Country: United States
- Branch: United States Army
- Size: Regiment
- Garrison/HQ: Fort Campbell, Kentucky
- Nickname: "Currahee"
- Motto: Currahee (Cherokee for Stands Alone)
- Decorations: Presidential Unit Citation (4) Valorous Unit Award (2); Meritorious Unit Commendation (5); French Croix de Guerre with Palm; Netherlands Orange Lanyard; Belgian Croix de Guerre with Palm Belgian Fourragère
- Campaign streamers: World War II: Operation Overlord; Rhineland; Battle of the Bulge; Western Allied invasion of Germany; Vietnam War: Counteroffensive, Phase III; Tet Counteroffensive; Counteroffensive, Phase IV; Counteroffensive, Phase V; Counteroffensive, Phase VI; Tet 69/Counteroffensive; Summer-Fall 1969; Winter-Spring 1970; Sanctuary Counteroffensive; Counteroffensive, Phase VII; Consolidation I; Consolidation II; Iraq Campaign Afghanistan Campaign

Commanders
- Notable commanders: Robert Sink; William A. McNulty

Insignia
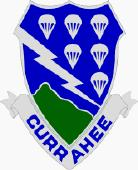
- Distinctive unit insignia

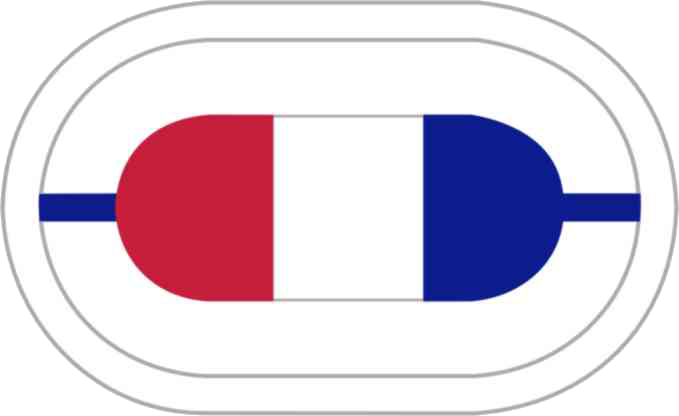
- 1st Battalion Airborne Background Trimming and Beret Flash

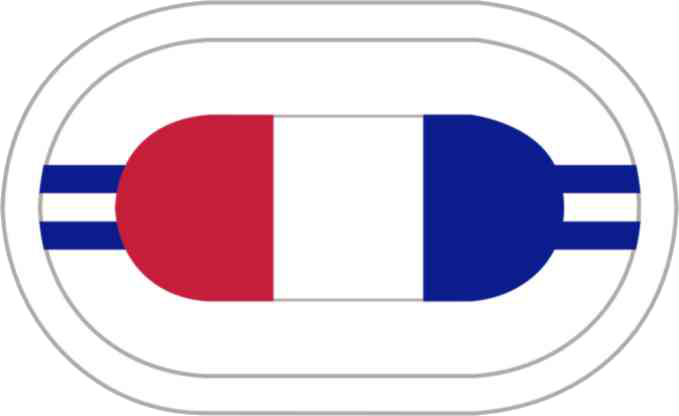
- 2nd Battalion Airborne Background Trimming and Beret Flash

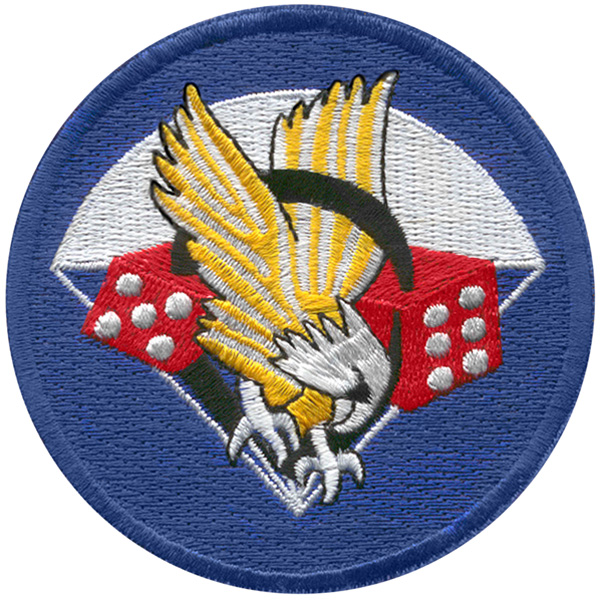
- World War II era pocket patch "Pair of Dice"

The 506th Infantry Regiment, originally designated the 506th Parachute Infantry Regiment (506th PIR) during World War II, is an airborne light infantry regiment of the United States Army. Currently a parent regiment under the U.S. Army Regimental System, the regiment has two active battalions: the 1st Battalion, 506th Infantry Regiment (1-506th IR) is assigned to the 1st Brigade Combat Team, 101st Airborne Division, and the 2nd Battalion, 506th Infantry Regiment (2-506th IR) is assigned to the 3rd Brigade Combat Team, 101st Airborne Division.

The regiment served with the 101st Airborne Division in World War II. Regimental elements have served with the 101st in Vietnam, Iraq, and Afghanistan. Regimental elements have also served in peacetime and in Iraq with the 2nd Infantry Division.

The World War II actions of E Company ("Easy Company") of the regiment's 2nd Battalion were portrayed in the 2001 HBO miniseries Band of Brothers.

== History ==
=== World War II ===
The regiment was initially formed during World War II at Camp Toccoa, Georgia, in 1942 where it earned its nickname, "Currahees", after the camp's Currahee Mountain. Paratroopers in training ran from Camp Toccoa up Currahee Mountain and back with the shout "three miles up, three miles down!" (5 km up, 5 km down). The Cherokee word, which translates to "Stand Alone", also became the unit's motto. Members of the unit wear the spade (♠) symbol on the helmet outer and the Screaming Eagle patch (indicating membership in the 101st Airborne Division) on the left sleeve. Its first commanding officer was Colonel Robert F. Sink, and the 506th was sometimes referred to as the "Five-Oh-Sink". On 10 June 1943, the 506th Parachute Infantry Regiment officially became part of the 101st Airborne Division, commanded by Major General William Lee, the "father of the U.S. Army Airborne".

Sink read in Reader's Digest about a Japanese Army unit that held the world record for marching. Sink believed his men could do better, so he marched the regiment from Camp Toccoa to Atlanta: 137 miles (220 km) in 75 hours and 15 minutes, including 33.5 hours of actual marching. Only 12 of the 2nd Battalion's 556 enlisted men failed to complete the march. All 30 officers completed it, including 2nd Battalion commander Major Robert Strayer. Newspapers covered the march; many civilians turned out to cheer the men as they neared Five Points. In Atlanta, they boarded trains for Airborne School in Fort Benning, Georgia.

The 506th would participate in three major battles during the war: D-Day landings, Operation Market Garden, and the Battle of the Bulge. They would have participated in Operation Varsity, but SHAEF decided to use the 17th Airborne Division instead.

==== D-Day: Operation Overlord ====
Like almost all paratrooper units, the 506th was widely scattered during the Mission Albany night drop on the morning of D-Day. The most famous action for the 506th on D-Day was the Brécourt Manor Assault led by 1st Lieutenant Richard Winters. Later, they fought in the Battle of Carentan.

The unit had been promised that they would be in battle for just three days, but the 506th did not return to England for 33 days. Of about 2,000 men who jumped into France, 231 were killed in action, 183 were missing or POWs, and 569 were wounded – about 50% casualties for the Normandy campaign.

==== Operation Market Garden ====
The airborne component of Operation Market Garden, Operation Market was composed of American units (82nd Airborne Division, the 101st Airborne Division, and the IX Troop Carrier Command), British units (1st Airborne Division) and Polish units (1st Independent Parachute Brigade). The airborne units were dropped near several key bridges along the axis of advance of the ground forces, Operation Garden, with the objective of capturing the bridges intact in order to allow a deep penetration into the German-occupied Netherlands and to capture the key bridge crossing the River Rhine at Arnhem.

The 101st Airborne was assigned five bridges just north of the German defensive lines northwest of Eindhoven. The daylight schedule resulted in well-targeted and controlled drops into the designated zones. The 101st successfully captured four bridges, although one was demolished by its defenders as the airborne units approached. The ground forces of British XXX Corps linked up with elements of the 101st Airborne on the second day of operations but the advance of the ground forces was delayed while engineers replaced the Son bridge with a Bailey bridge. XXX Corps then continued its advance into the 82nd Airborne's area of operations where it was halted just shy of Arnhem due to German counterattacks along the length of the deep penetration.

The 101st Airborne continued to support XXX Corps advance during the remainder of Operation Market Garden with several running battles over the next several days. On 5 October after the operation had ended the 101st then came up to the Nijmegen salient and relieved the British 43rd Wessex Division to defend against the German counter offensive.

==== Battle of the Bulge ====
The 506th fought in the Battle of the Bulge from December 1944 to January 1945. In December, the unit, along with the rest of the 101st Airborne Division, was resting and refitting in France after Operation Market Garden. On 16 December, General Dwight D. Eisenhower, the Supreme Allied Commander on the Western Front, ordered them to move into the Belgian town of Bastogne by 18 December, so that the Germans would not gain access to its important crossroads. The short-notice move left the unit short of food, ammunition, arms, men, and winter clothing. The unit, along with the rest of the 101st Airborne, was encircled immediately. The 506th was sent to the eastern section of the siege. During the siege, there were reports of problems with tying in the gap in between the 501st PIR and the 506th. To stall the Germans so that the defense could be set up, the 1st Battalion of the 506th (along with Team Desobry from the 10th Armored Division) was sent out to fight the Germans in the towns of Noville and Foy. One-third (about 200 men) of the battalion were killed or wounded, but the unit took out 30 enemy tanks and inflicted 500 to 1,000 casualties. The battalion was put into reserve and the 2nd and 3rd Battalions were put on the lines. A supply drop on 22 December helped to some extent. After the U.S. Third Army, under General George Patton, broke the encirclement, the 506th stayed on the line and spearheaded the offensive by liberating Foy and Noville in January. They were then transferred to Haguenau and pulled off the line in late February 1945.

==== Rest of the war ====
The regiment was put back on the line on 2 April, and continued for the rest of the war, taking light casualties. It helped encircle the Ruhr Pocket and capture Berchtesgaden, then took up occupational duties in Zell am See, Austria. The 506th then began training to be redeployed to the Pacific theater but the war ended in August 1945.

=== Post-World War II ===
The 506th was deactivated in 1945, then was re-activated as the 506th Airborne Infantry Regiment in 1948–1949, again in 1950–1953 and finally, in 1954 to train recruits. Despite the designation "Airborne Infantry" and its continuing assignment in the 101st Airborne Division, none of these troops received airborne training, nor was the "Airborne" tab worn above the Divisional patch.

The colors of the 101st were reactivated as a combat division in 1956 under the Pentomic structure, which eliminated infantry regiments and battalions in favor of five battle groups per division. The colors of Company A, 504AIR were reactivated as HHC, 1st Airborne Battle Group, 506th Infantry, the only active element of the 506th. In February of 1962 The Battlegroup Reinforced deployed to the Philippines and pioneered the use of Hueys in Air Assault. It was the first US ground forces in the Philippines since WWII. Just before the Cuban Missile Crisis, on 1 October 1962, C Company (the Division's alert-ready unit at the time) was deployed to Oxford, Mississippi to assist in restoring order after James Meredith arrived to integrate the University of Mississippi. The entire Battlegroup deployed to Oxford. The Battlegroup left Oxford and redeployed to Millington Naval Air Station where they remained for some time in the event of renewal of rioting.

==== Vietnam ====
The Pentomic structure was abandoned in 1964 in favor of brigades and battalions, and the 1st ABG, 506th Infantry was reorganized and redesignated as 1st Battalion (Airborne), 506th Infantry. Additionally, the lineage of Co. B, 506AIR was reactivated as HHC, 2nd Battalion (Airborne), 506th Infantry. Both battalions were part of the 3rd Brigade, 101st Airborne Division, which was deployed to Vietnam from late 1967 to 1971 to fight in the Vietnam War. 1-506th was recognized for its role during the Tet Offensive in early 1968 and the Battle of Hamburger Hill in May 1969 together with 2-506th, during the Battle of Fire Support Base Ripcord.

On 1 April 1967 the colors of the former Company C, 506AIR were reactivated at Fort Campbell as HHC, 3rd Battalion, 506th Infantry. Assigned to the 1st Brigade, it served in Vietnam and was inactivated at Fort Campbell on 31 July 1972.

The division, including the 506th, was reorganized as Airmobile in 1968, later renamed Air Assault in 1974. During the Vietnam War, five soldiers from the 506th were awarded the Medal of Honor.

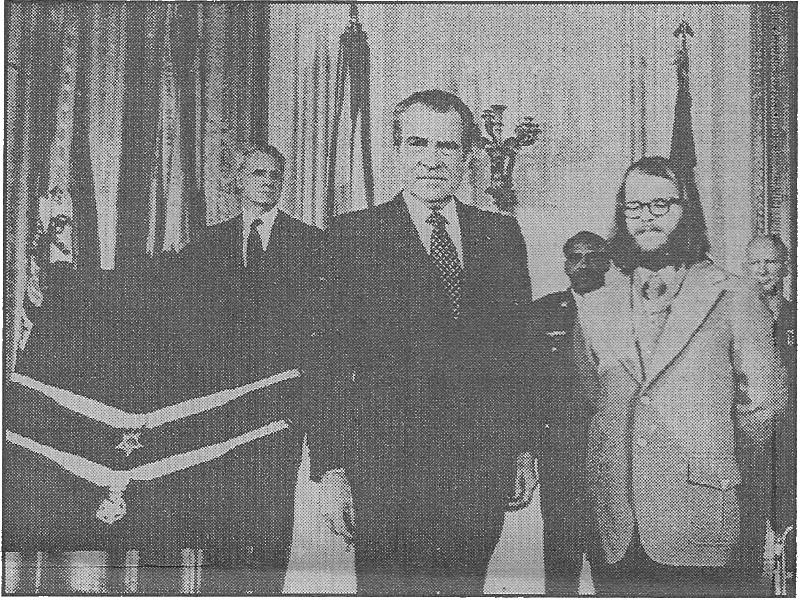
Kenneth Michael Kays receiving the Medal of Honor from U.S. President Richard Nixon

==== Post-Vietnam ====
When the 101st was reformed in 1973 at Fort Campbell (after its return from Vietnam), the 1st Battalion was the only active unit of the regiment, assigned to the division's 2nd Brigade. The battalion deployed to various training missions across the United States. In 1980, for example, deployments included Fort Drum, New York; Camp Grayling, Michigan; and Fort Polk, Louisiana. In addition, members of Charlie Company were present at President Ronald Reagan's inauguration, 20 January 1981. After redeployment from Fort Polk, "Hardcore Charlie" was detached to the 1st Battalion, 502nd Infantry, for Exercise Bright Star 81 in September, to "round out" that unit when it deployed to the Sinai Peninsula for peacekeeping duties. This was the first U.S. military force to be deployed to the Middle East since the end of World War II. The battalion colors were inactivated on 5 June 1984 when all of the infantry battalions of the brigade were reflagged as elements of the 502nd Infantry.

==== South Korea ====
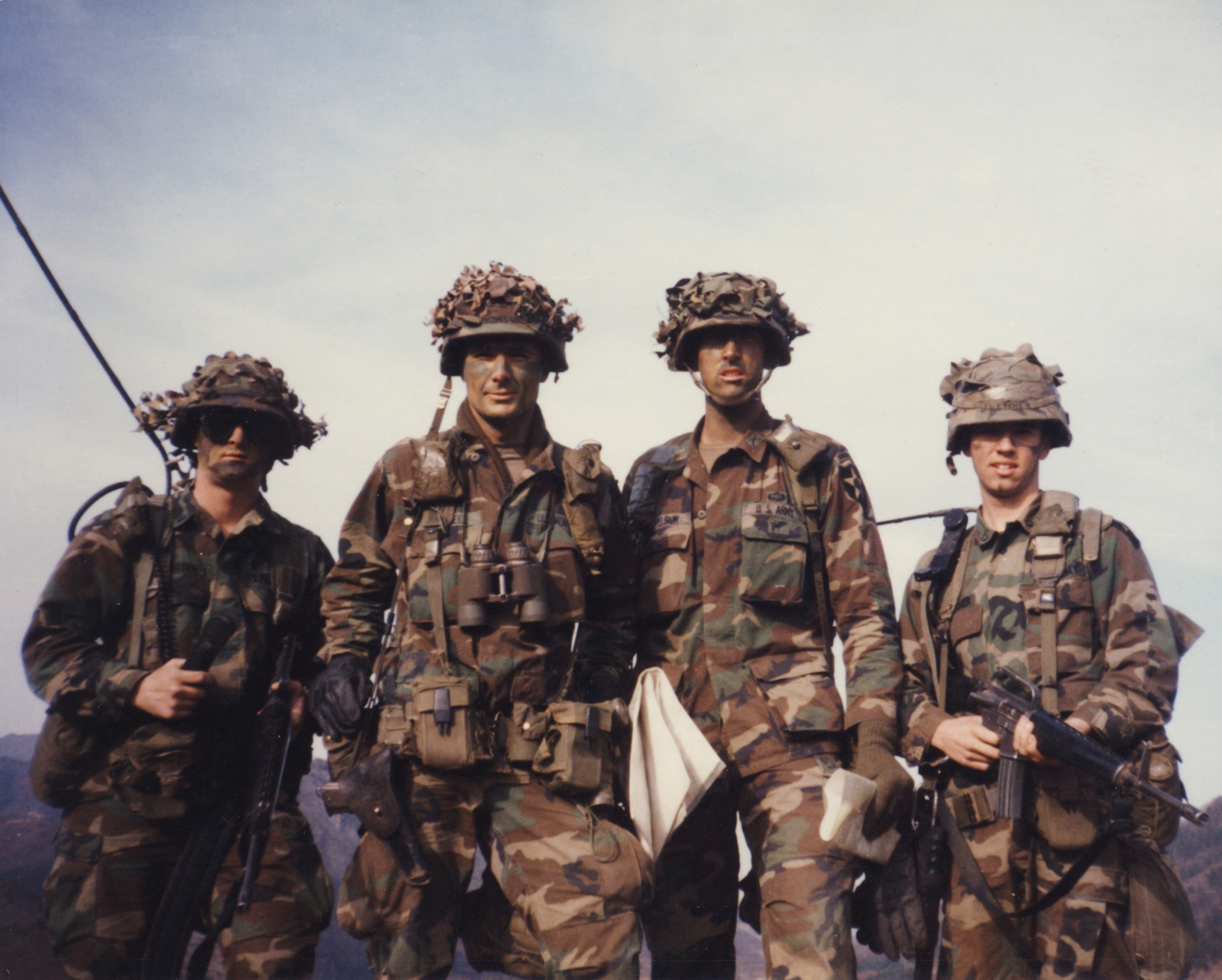
Soldiers from Charlie Company, 1st Battalion, 506th Infantry Regiment patrolling the Korean Demilitarized Zone near GP Ouellette in 1987

The battalion was reactivated on 16 March 1987 as part of the 3rd Brigade, 2nd Infantry Division in South Korea, by reflagging the 1st Battalion, 9th Infantry Regiment at Camp Greaves. The 1st Battalion continued the mission to man Guard Posts Ouellette and Collier, conduct combat and reconnaissance patrols, man the southern entrance to the Korean Demilitarized Zone, and maintain the platoon that guarded Freedom Bridge. It was organized as an air assault battalion, 1-506 Infantry (Air Assault), and eventually switched brigades in a 2nd Infantry Division reorganization in 1994. The majority of the battalion remained north of the Imjin River at Camp Greaves, while Company A moved south of Freedom Bridge to Camp Giant in Munsan.

=== Global War on Terror ===
==== Iraq ====
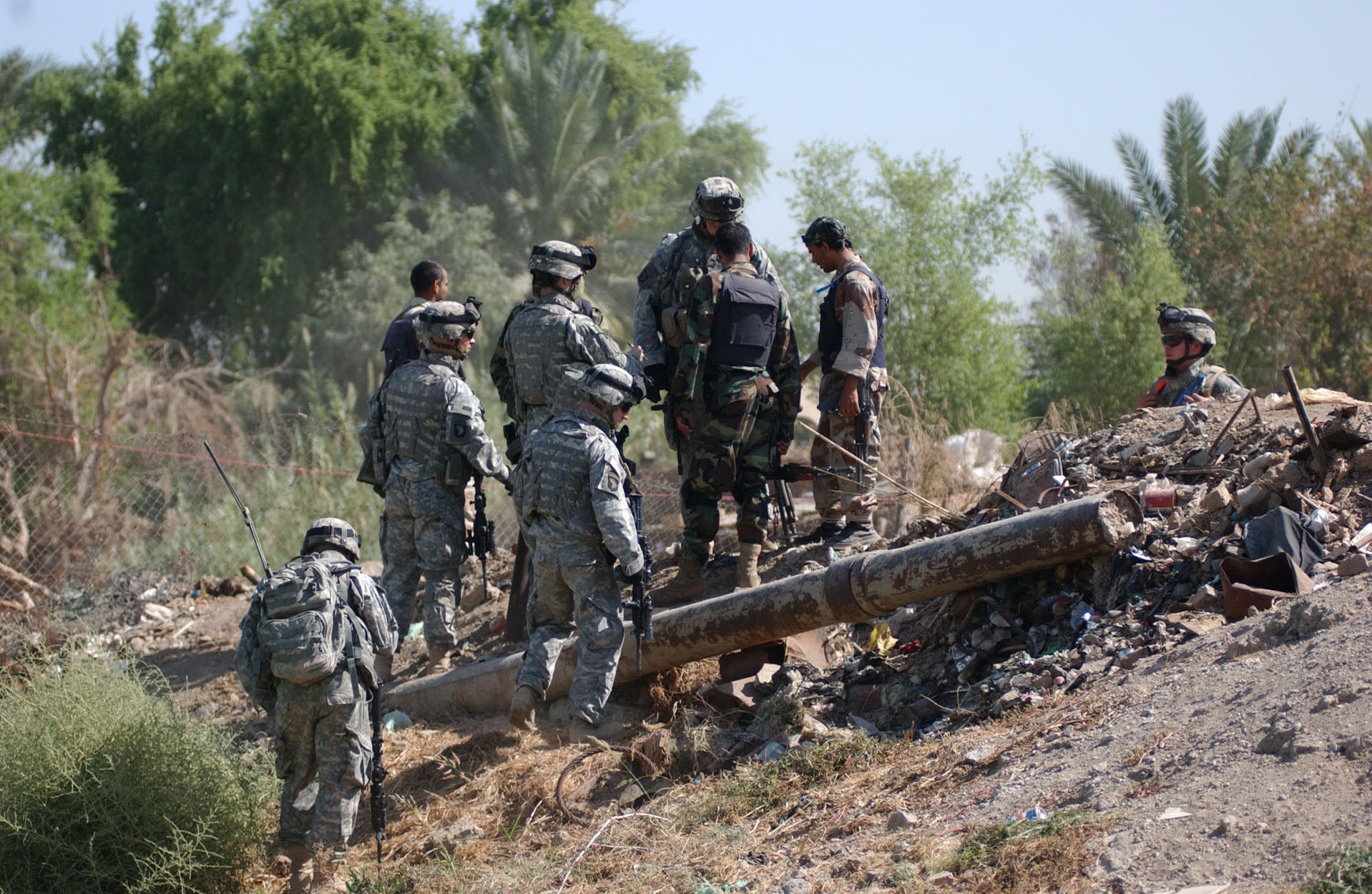
Iraqi National Police and U.S. Army Soldiers from the 2nd Battalion, 506th Infantry Regiment, discover a weapons cache in Dora, Baghdad on 8 Oct. 2006.

In 2004, 1-506th was deployed from Korea to Habbaniyah, Iraq in the Iraq War. Instead of returning to Korea, the battalion redeployed to Fort Carson, Colorado on 30 September 2005 to be reflagged to 2-12th Infantry Regiment. On 30 September 2005, it was relieved with less personnel and equipment from assignment to the 2d Infantry Division and assigned to the 4th Brigade Combat Team, 101st Airborne Division. Concurrently, a "new" 1-506th was created by reflagging an existing battalion within the 101st and assigning it to the division's 4th Brigade Combat Team. Additionally, the colors of 2-506th were reactivated within the 4th BCT, again by reflagging an existing battalion.

The 1st Battalion (1-506) deployed to Ramadi, Al-Anbar Province, Iraq, from November 2005 until November 2006. The headquarters and headquarters company, Companies A, B, C, D, and elements of Company E, 801st BSB, occupied Camp Corregidor, the main FOB Camp Manhattan. Companies HHC, A, B, C, and D were tasked with missions in the Mulaab District of Ramadi. Company A occupied the combat outpost, which shared the facility with the HHC medical aid station, elements of Company E, 801st BSB, and a platoon of sappers from Company C, 876th Engineer Battalion, part of the 2nd Brigade, 28th Division, Pennsylvania National Guard. Company A was tasked with operations ranging from the north of FOB Corregidor to the Euphrates. Company B was posted 7 kilometers to the east of FOB Corregidor at OP Trotter, with a separate mission of protecting the most vulnerable part of the main supply route leading into Ramadi, and the occupation of OP Graveyard, an isolated and abandoned cemetery to the south of the MSR. Time described Ramadi during this time as "The Most Dangerous Place". During this time, forward observers from Task Force 1-506 were the first to call in a Guided Multiple Launch Rocket System strike in combat.

The 2d Battalion (2-506) deployed to FOB Falcon in South Baghdad, cross-attached to the 4th Brigade, 4th Infantry Division from November 2005 to November 2006 under Lieutenant Colonel Gregory Butts. During the Baghdad clearance operations that set the stage for the Iraq War troop surge of 2007 under General David Petraeus, the 2nd Battalion, 506th Infantry and the Iraqi Police conducted the first deliberate clear-hold-build operation in the Doura Market as part of Operation Together Forward II under Multi-National Division – Baghdad. Careful examination of their techniques, tactics, and procedures resulted in the emulation of their tactics for similar operations across Baghdad for the next six months, a temporary measure until surge forces could arrive and set up joint security stations.

==== Afghanistan ====
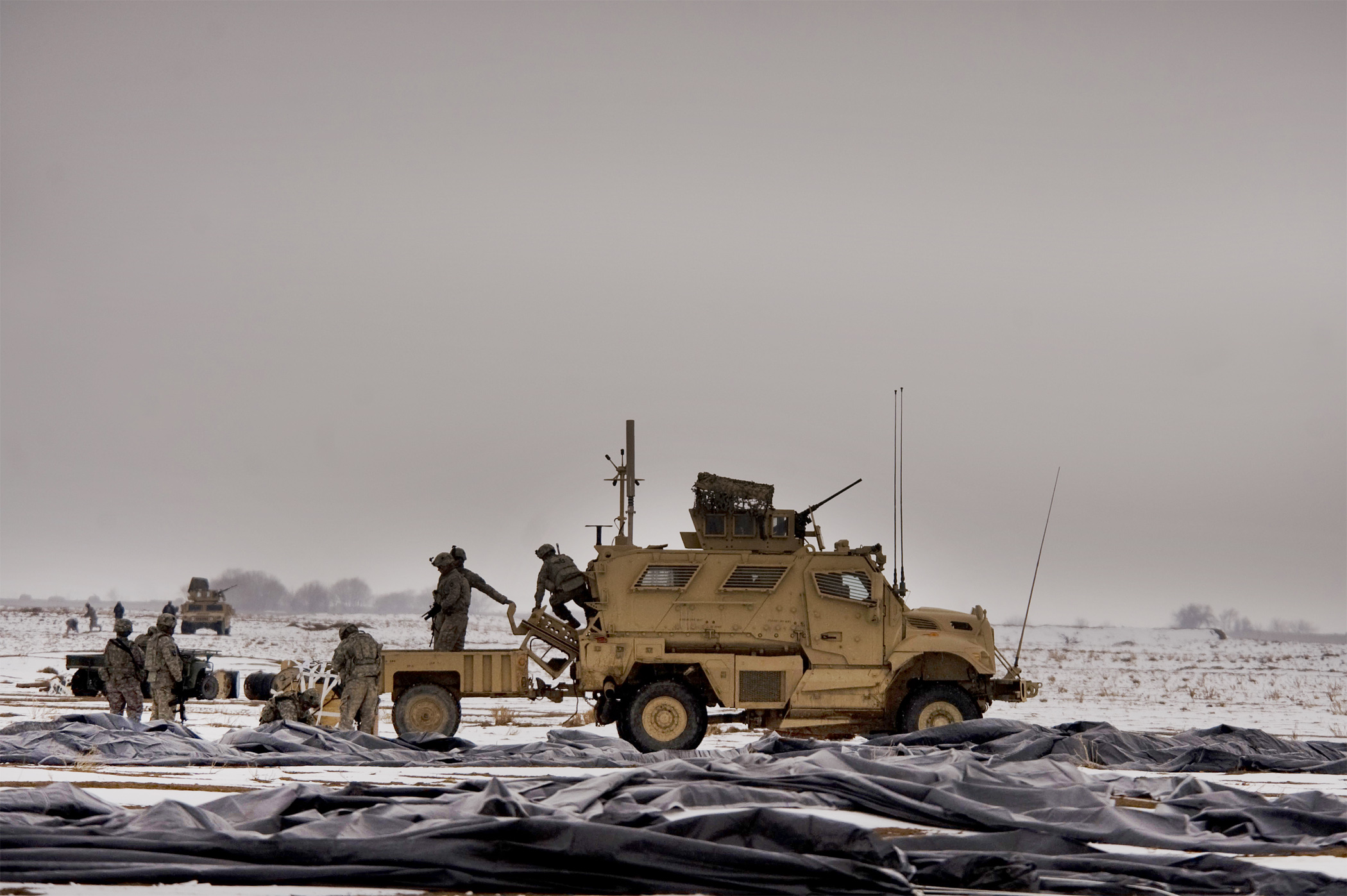
Soldiers from Task Force Currahee, 4th Brigade Combat Team, 101st Airborne Division recovering airdropped fuel at FOB Waza K'wah in January 2011

In early 2008, the 4th Brigade Combat Team, 101st Airborne Division (the 1-506th and 2-506th being part of that brigade), deployed in support of Operation Enduring Freedom in the War in Afghanistan. 1st Battalion was deployed to the Ghazni, Wardak, and Western Paktika Provinces with the exception of Company A, split in half (1st and 2nd platoons) along with a platoon from Company D to assist a team from 10th Special Forces Group in Kapisa Province in the outpost FOB Kutchsbach for the first six months of the deployment. After completing their mission in establishing a safe area of operation in the Tagab Valley and a large compound to support a French Army battalion, the units rejoined their companies that were scattered in the other provinces. Much of the fighting was with insurgents that attempted to interdict the main highway from Kabul to Kandahar. The three-man "Shamsheer" team, part of the Operations Coordination Center Province, was widely used in collecting intel, locating enemy positions and high-value targets, and finding caches with the Afghan National Police. The 2nd Battalion was deployed primarily in Khost Province, with elements serving in eastern Paktika and Kandahar Provinces. The 2nd Battalion's Company D served in some of the most brutal firefights of the deployment, losing seven soldiers during rotation. The 506th returned to Fort Campbell in March 2009. In 2011 Company C was deployed to FOB Khayr-Khot Castle, where they assisted 5th and 20th Special Forces Group.

E Company, 2nd Battalion, 506th Infantry Regiment soldiers in Khost Province, Afghanistan in June 2013

In spring 2013, the 4th Brigade Combat Team, 101st Airborne Division, deployed to Afghanistan. With operations in southeastern Afghanistan, Task Force Currahee executed security force assistance operations to develop the capability of Afghan National Security Forces in Khost, Paktia, Paktika, and South Ghazni Provinces ahead of the 2014 Afghan presidential election. Despite operating at a reduced strength of 2,400 soldiers, TF Currahee and the Afghan National Army's 1st Brigade, 203rd Corps conducted training alongside combat operations, killing approximately 600 enemies and expanding ANSF operations into regions last untouched since 2001, including Paktia and Logar Province.

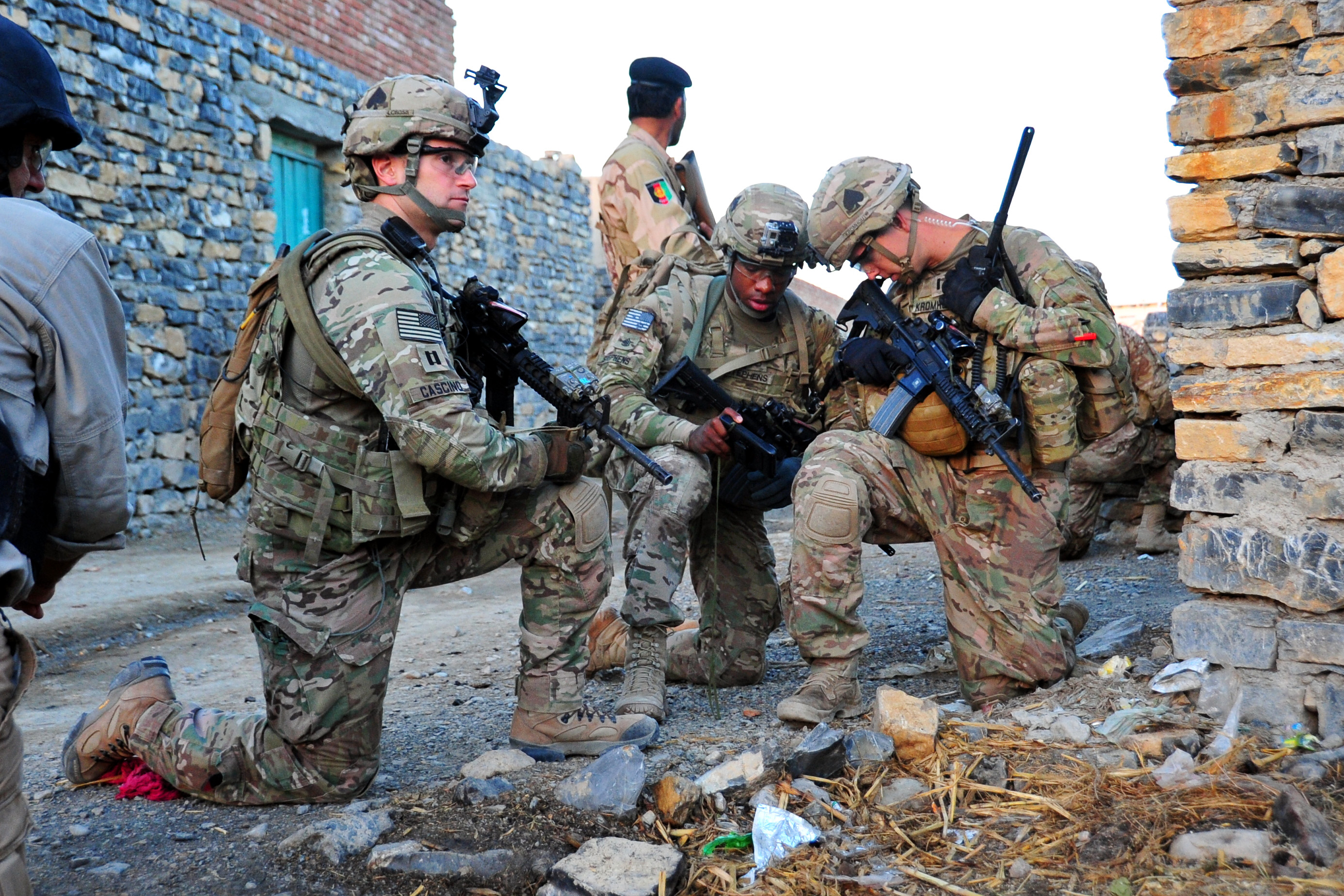
E Company, 2nd Battalion, 506th Infantry Regiment soldiers during a patrol in Khost Province, Afghanistan in October 2013

1st Battalion, 506th Infantry Regiment, Task Force Red Currahee, deployed to Paktya and Khowst Provinces at the end of April 2013 and assumed responsibility of over two thirds of the entire brigade AOR in May. TF Red Currahee maintained responsibility for approximately 2,809 square miles (7,280 km^{2}) of battlespace (adding approximately 560 square miles (1,500 km^{2}) of Paktika Province in the final months of the deployment) and three assistance platforms with an 8,500-strong ANSF contingent, and executed over 270 partnered patrols, 180 partnered named operations, and over 70 quick reaction force and time-sensitive target missions, during which TF Red Currahee fired over 2,291 rounds of artillery, conducted 14 close air support strikes, and executed 11 ISR kinetic strikes (a 144 percent increase from the years prior, making it the most kinetic province in Train Advise Assist Command – East). In all, TF Red Currahee's operations killed approximately 150 enemies and five high-value individuals; combined with ANSF and other task forces' operations, over 300 enemies were killed and nearly 250 detained. Without losing focus on lethal targeting, TF Red Currahee focused on the transfer of its three APs to the ANSF, the first being AP Chamkani, followed by AP Zormat and AP Wilderness, retrograding approximately $106 million worth of government property. 2nd Battalion, 506th Infantry Regiment, Task Force White Currahee, in conjunction with three SFAAT teams, advised and assisted ANSF in Khost Province. Using a warrant-based targeting methodology, TF White Currahee and ANSF elements detained 53 enemy combatants, with most being convicted and imprisoned.

In honor of a fallen ANSF soldier, the "Hero of Khowst" competition was created by CSM Lamont Christian to mirror the U.S. Army's Sergeant Audie Murphy Club. Select NCOs from 3rd BN, 1st BDE, 203rd ANA Corps, were put through physical and mental tests and the top four competitors were recognized and awarded at FOB Salerno in the beginning of October, with the first NCO recipients of the award continuing the event annually until the Fall of Afghanistan. TF White Currahee successfully transferred eastern Khost Province from ANSF security primacy to full ANSF control with the successful transfer of AFCOP Sabari, AFCOP Matun Hill, and FOB Salerno. On the 10th anniversary of the first U.S. task force's arrival at FOB Salerno, TF White Currahee departed to conduct ANSF training across the remainder of Train Advise Assist Command – East.

=== Post-GWOT ===
In March 2024, 1st Battalion of the 506th Infantry Regiment was the first U.S. Army unit to be issued the XM7 rifle and XM250 squad automatic weapon.

== Current organization ==
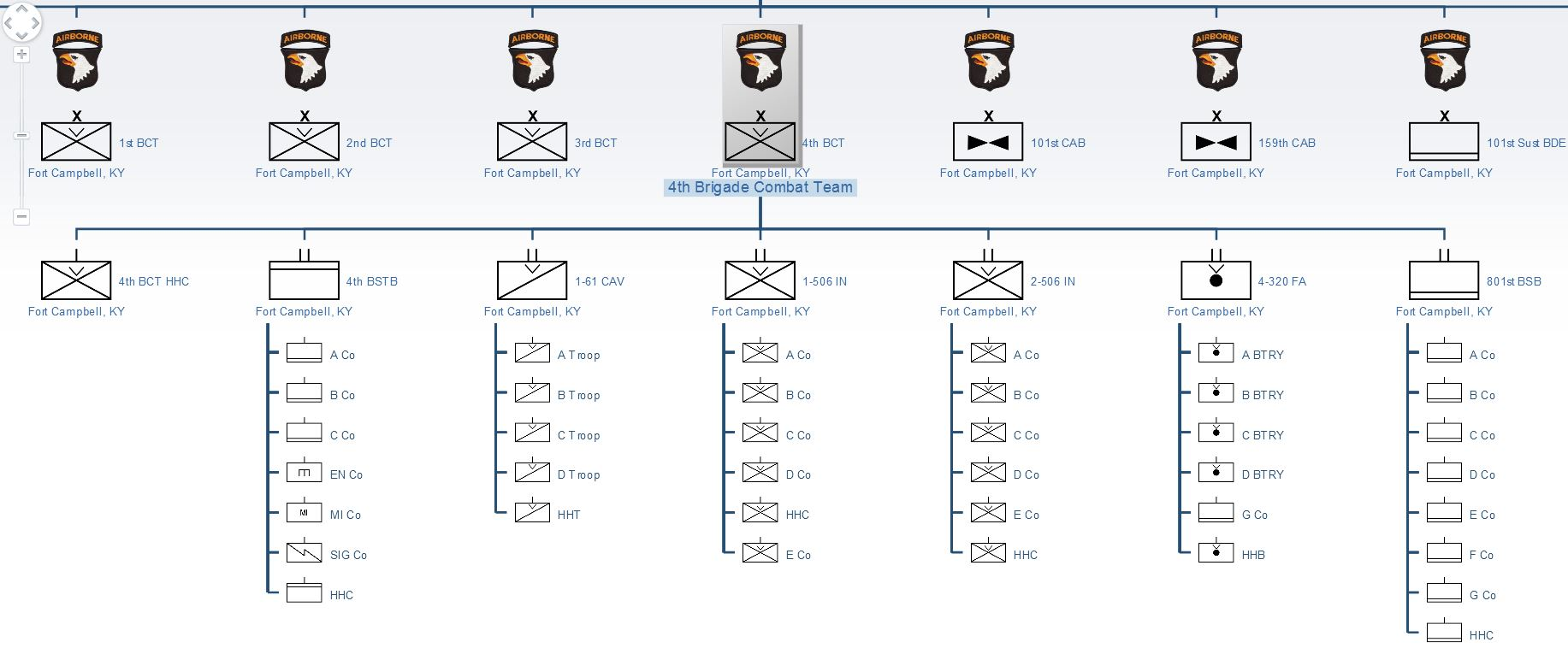
Structure of 4th BCT, 101st Airborne Division (Air Assault) prior to inactivation

As part of the Army-wide reduction of brigade combat teams, 4th Brigade Combat Team "Currahee", 101st Airborne Division was inactivated on 25 April 2014.

Presently, the 506th Infantry Regiment legacy continues through its infantry battalions which continue to serve within the 101st Airborne Division.

Current assignments of active units of the regiment:

- 1st Battalion, 506th Infantry [Regiment] "Red Currahee", 1st BCT "Bastogne", 101st Airborne Division
- 2nd Battalion, 506th Infantry [Regiment] "White Currahee", 3rd BCT "Rakkasan", 101st Airborne Division

== Lineage, honors, and heraldry ==
=== Lineage ===
Constituted 1 July 1942 in the Army of the United States as the 506th Parachute Infantry

Activated 20 July 1942 at Camp Toccoa, Georgia

Assigned 10 June 1943 to the 101st Airborne Division

Inactivated 30 November 1945 in France

Redesignated 18 June 1948 as the 506th Airborne Infantry

Allotted 25 June 1948 to the Regular Army

Activated 6 July 1948 at Camp Breckinridge, Kentucky

Inactivated 1 April 1949 at Camp Breckinridge, Kentucky

Activated 25 August 1950 at Camp Breckinridge, Kentucky

Inactivated 1 December 1953 at Camp Breckinridge, Kentucky

Activated 15 May 1954 at Fort Jackson, South Carolina

Relieved 25 April 1957 from assignment to the 101st Airborne Division; concurrently reorganized and redesignated as the 506th Infantry, a parent regiment under the Combat Arms Regimental System

Withdrawn 16 March 1987 from the Combat Arms Regimental System and reorganized under the United States Army Regimental System

Constituted 16 September 2004 in the Regular Army as Headquarters, 4th Brigade Combat Team, 101st Airborne Division, and activated at Fort Campbell, Kentucky (The 4th BCT, 101st Abn Div was the next highest echelon above 1-506th and 2-506th and has a separate lineage from the 506th Infantry Regiment.)

Redesignated 1 October 2005 as the 506th Infantry Regiment

Re-aligned 16 April 2014 at Fort Campbell, Kentucky under 1st and 3d BCTs, 101st Abn Div.

=== Campaign participation credit ===
World War II	Vietnam	War on Terrorism
Normandy (with arrowhead)	Counteroffensive, Phase III	Iraqi Governance 2004-2005
Rhineland (with arrowhead)	Tet Counteroffensive	National Resolution 2005-2007 (Iraq)
Ardennes-Alsace	Counteroffensive, Phase IV	Consolidation II 2008-2009 (Afghanistan)
Central Europe	Counteroffensive, Phase V	Consolidation III 2010-2011 (Afghanistan)
Central Europe	Counteroffensive, Phase V	Transition I 2013 (Afghanistan) (TBA)
	Counteroffensive, Phase VI
Tet 69/Counteroffensive
Summer-Fall 1969
Winter-Spring 1970
Sanctuary Counteroffensive
Counteroffensive, Phase VII
Consolidation I
Consolidation II

=== Decorations ===
Presidential Unit Citation (Army), Streamer embroidered NORMANDY

Presidential Unit Citation (Army), Streamer embroidered BASTOGNE

Presidential Unit Citation (Army), Streamer embroidered TRANG BANG

Presidential Unit Citation (Army), Streamer embroidered DONG AP BIA MOUNTAIN

Valorous Unit Award, Streamer embroidered PHAN THIET

Valorous Unit Award, Streamer embroidered DEFENSE OF SAIGON

Meritorious Unit Commendation (Army), Streamer embroidered VIETNAM 1968

Meritorious Unit Commendation (Army), Streamer embroidered IRAQ 2005-2006

French Croix de Guerre with Palm, World War II, Streamer embroidered NORMANDY

Netherlands Orange Lanyard

Belgian Croix de Guerre 1940 with Palm, Streamer embroidered BASTOGNE; cited in the order of the Day of the Belgian Army for action at Bastogne

Belgian Fourragere 1940: Cited in the Order of the Day of the Belgian Army for action in France and Belgium

Meritorious Unit Commendation (Army), Streamer embroidered AFGHANISTAN 2008-2009

Meritorious Unit Commendation (Army), Streamer embroidered AFGHANISTAN 2010-2011

Meritorious Unit Commendation (Army), Streamer embroidered AFGHANISTAN 2013

=== Heraldry ===
==== Coat of arms ====
Shield

The blue field is for the Infantry, the 506th's arm of the service. Thunderbolt indicates the regiment's particular threat and technique to attack: striking with speed, power, and surprise from the sky. Six parachutes represent the fact that the 506th was in the sixth parachute regiment activated in the U.S. Army, of which, the unit is proud. The green silhouette represents the Currahee Mountain -- the site of the regiment's activation (Toccoa, Ga.) -- and symbolizes the organization's strength, independence, and ability to stand alone for which paratroops are renowned.

Crest

The winged sword-breaker represents airborne troops. The conjoined caltraps stand for the enemy line of defense behind which paratroopers are dropped. They are two in number in reference to the unit's two air assault landings. The fleur-de-lis is for the Normandy invasion and the bugle horn, from the arms of Eindhoven, the Netherlands, refers to the organization's capture of that objective. The six large spikes of the caltraps stand for the unit's six decorations. The demi-roundel represents a section of the hub of a wheel. It stands for Bastogne, Belgium, strategic crossroads of highways and railways. The hub, surmounted by the winged sword-breaker, commemorates the organization's heroic defense of Bastogne in the Battle of the Bulge.

Motto

CURRAHEE. American Aboriginal, Cherokee Tongue meaning Stands Alone.

==== Background ====
The coat of arms was originally approved for the 506th Parachute Infantry Regiment on 20 Apr 1943. It was amended on 23 Aug 1943 to correct the blazon. The coat of arms was redesignated for the 506th Airborne Infantry Regiment on 18 Mar 1949. On 27 Feb 1958 it was redesignated for the 506th Infantry.

== Notable members ==
=== Medal of Honor recipients ===
Of the twenty-two Medals of Honor awarded to soldiers of the 101st Airborne, eight were Currahees and one was a US Navy SEAL attached to the Currahees.

- Clyde Lee Choate

Rank and organization: Staff Sergeant, Company C, 601st Tank Destroyer Battalion
Place and date: Near Bruyeres, France, 25 October 1944

- Leslie H. Sabo, Jr.

Rank and Organization: Specialist Four, Company B, 3rd Battalion
Place and Date: Se San, Cambodia, 10 May 1970

- Frank A. Herda

Rank and Organization: Specialist Four, Company A, 1st Battalion
Place and date: Near Dak To, Quang Trang Province, South Vietnam, 29 June 1968

- Gordon Ray Roberts

Rank and Organization: Specialist Fourth Class (rank at time of presentation: Sergeant; highest rank: Colonel), Company B, 1st Battalion
Place and Date: Thua Thien Province, South Vietnam, 11 July 1969

- Kenneth Michael Kays

Rank and Organization: Private first class (rank at time of action: Private), Company D, 1st Battalion
Place and Date: Firebase Maureen, Thua Thien province, South Vietnam, 7 May 1970

- Kenneth J. David

Rank and Organization: Private first class, Company D, 1st Battalion
Place and date: Firebase Maureen, Thua Thien province, South Vietnam, 7 May 1970

- Andre Lucas

Rank and Organization: Lieutenant colonel, 2nd Battalion
Place and Date: Fire Support Base Ripcord, South Vietnam, 1 to 23 July 1970

- Peter M. Guenette

Rank and Organization: Specialist Four, Company D, 2nd Battalion
Place and date: Quan Tan Uyen Province, South Vietnam, 18 May 1968

- Michael A. Monsoor

Rank and Organization: Petty Officer 2nd Class, US Navy Seal Team 3 attached to 1st Battalion
Place and date: Ar Ramadi, Iraq, 29 September 2006

=== World War II ===
- Donald Burgett, of Company A, fought from Normandy to the end of the war. He wrote four books on his time in the company.
- Sergeant Joseph Beyrle, of Company I, fought for US and Russian forces.
- Colonel (later Lieutenant General) Robert F. Sink, regimental commander for all of World War II.
- Lieutenant Colonel Robert Lee Wolverton, commanding officer of 3rd battalion.
- Easy Company, 2nd Battalion
  - First Lieutenant Lynn "Buck" Compton, officer with Company E during World War II and chief prosecutor in the case of Sirhan Sirhan. He has published a book called "Call of Duty: My Life before, during and after the Band of Brothers".
  - Staff Sergeant William "Wild Bill" Guarnere, a colorful noncom of Company E who maintained a website devoted to the history of the 506th until his death in 2014. The website continues to be maintained.
  - First Lieutenant Carwood Lipton, company first sergeant, later promoted to 2nd Lieutenant via battlefield commission.
  - Technical Sergeant Donald Malarkey, non-commissioned officer, served in Easy Company for the entire war. He has published a book called Easy Company Soldier.
  - Captain Lewis Nixon, intelligence officer and close friend of Major Richard Winters.
  - Lieutenant Colonel Herbert Sobel, initial commanding officer.
  - Lieutenant Colonel Ronald Speirs, took command of Company E during their assault on Foy, Belgium in January 1945. Final commanding officer. Went on to become commandant of Spandau Prison.
  - Private First Class David Webster, a rifleman and diarist of Company E whose book Parachute Infantry deals in detail with the 506th.
  - Major Richard Winters started out as a platoon leader in Company E. Was made company commander when the commander's (Lieutenant Meehan) plane was shot down on D-Day. He was made 2nd Battalion Executive Officer during Operation Market Garden in October 1944. Took over as acting battalion commander during the siege of Bastogne. Became permanent 2nd Battalion commander in March 1945, and stayed in that position until the end of the war. He published a memoir of his war service (Beyond Band of Brothers) and has also been the subject of a biography (Biggest Brother).
- Filthy Thirteen

== In popular culture ==
- The book Band of Brothers tells the story of Easy Company, and was the basis of a successful TV miniseries, aired on HBO.
- In the film Saving Private Ryan, the titular Pvt. James Francis Ryan of Iowa states he was assigned to Baker Company (B Co.) 1-506th. Captain Miller also encountered 506th Pathfinders early on in the movie during the search for Pvt. Ryan.
- In the video game Call of Duty, the player character in the American campaign is depicted as a soldier from the 506th as denoted by the spade insignia on his helmet. A Veterans Day video released for Call of Duty: WWII in 2017 also featured Paul Martinez from the 506th Parachute Infantry Regiment.
- In the video game Company of Heroes, the player controls paratroopers from 506th's Fox Company in some of the main campaign missions.
- In the film Saints and Soldiers, the characters are from the 506th Infantry Regiment, as depicted by the black Spade on their helmets.
- In the Tom Clancy novel Without Remorse, Emmet Ryan, father of Jack Ryan, claimed to have jumped on D-Day with "E 2-506th".
