= William A. McNulty =

United States Army officer (1910–2005)

William Anderson McNulty
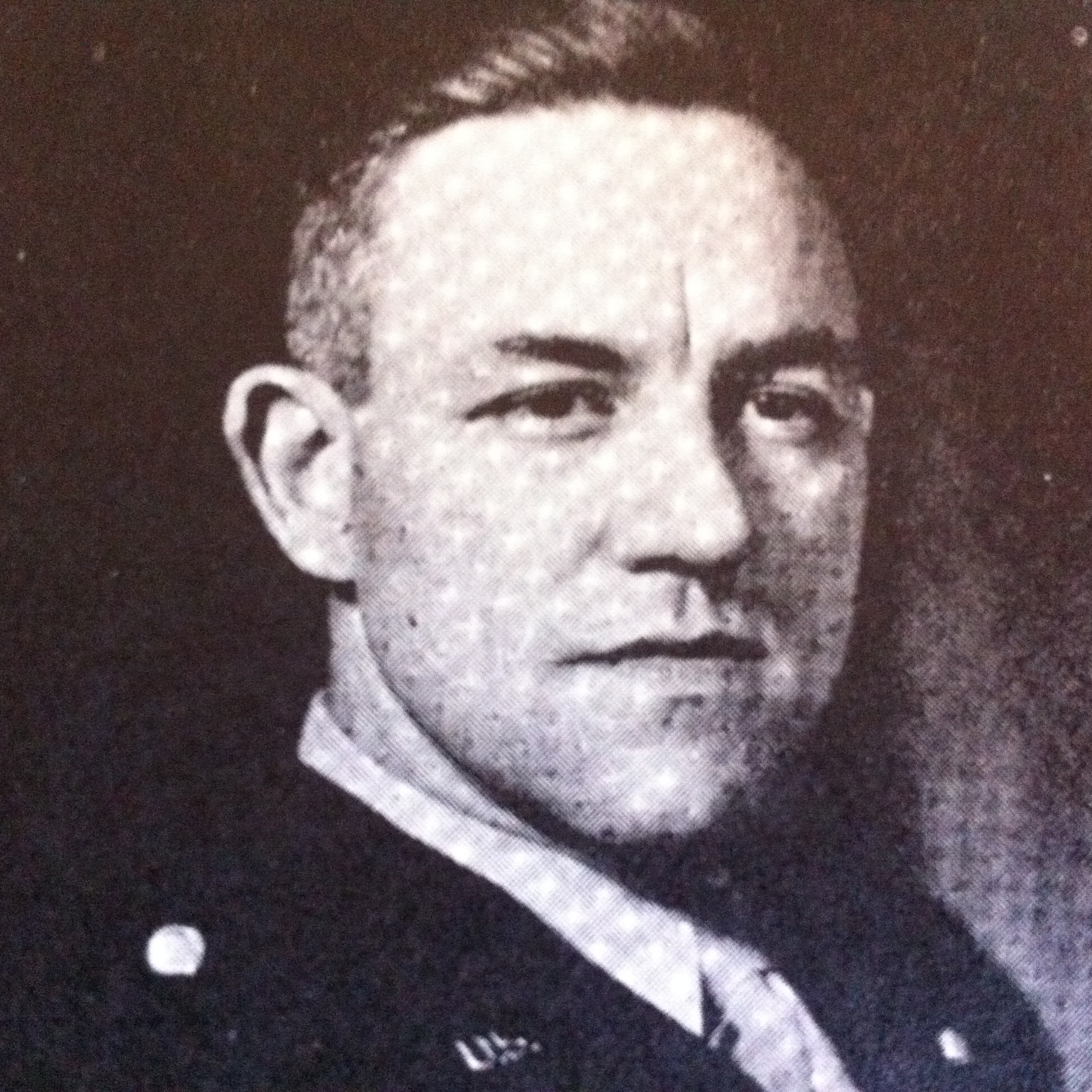
- Born: September 29, 1910; Roanoke, Virginia, U.S.
- Died: January 25, 2005 (aged 94); Roanoke, Virginia, U.S.
- Military career
- Allegiance: United States
- Branch: United States Army
- Service years: 1932–1962
- Rank: Colonel
- Service number: 0-18871
- Commands: 3rd Battalion, 301st Infantry Regiment
- Conflicts: World War II; Cold War
- Awards: Silver Star; Legion of Merit; Bronze Star Medal

William Anderson McNulty (September 29, 1910 – January 25, 2005) was a decorated officer of the United States of America during World War II.

== Early years ==
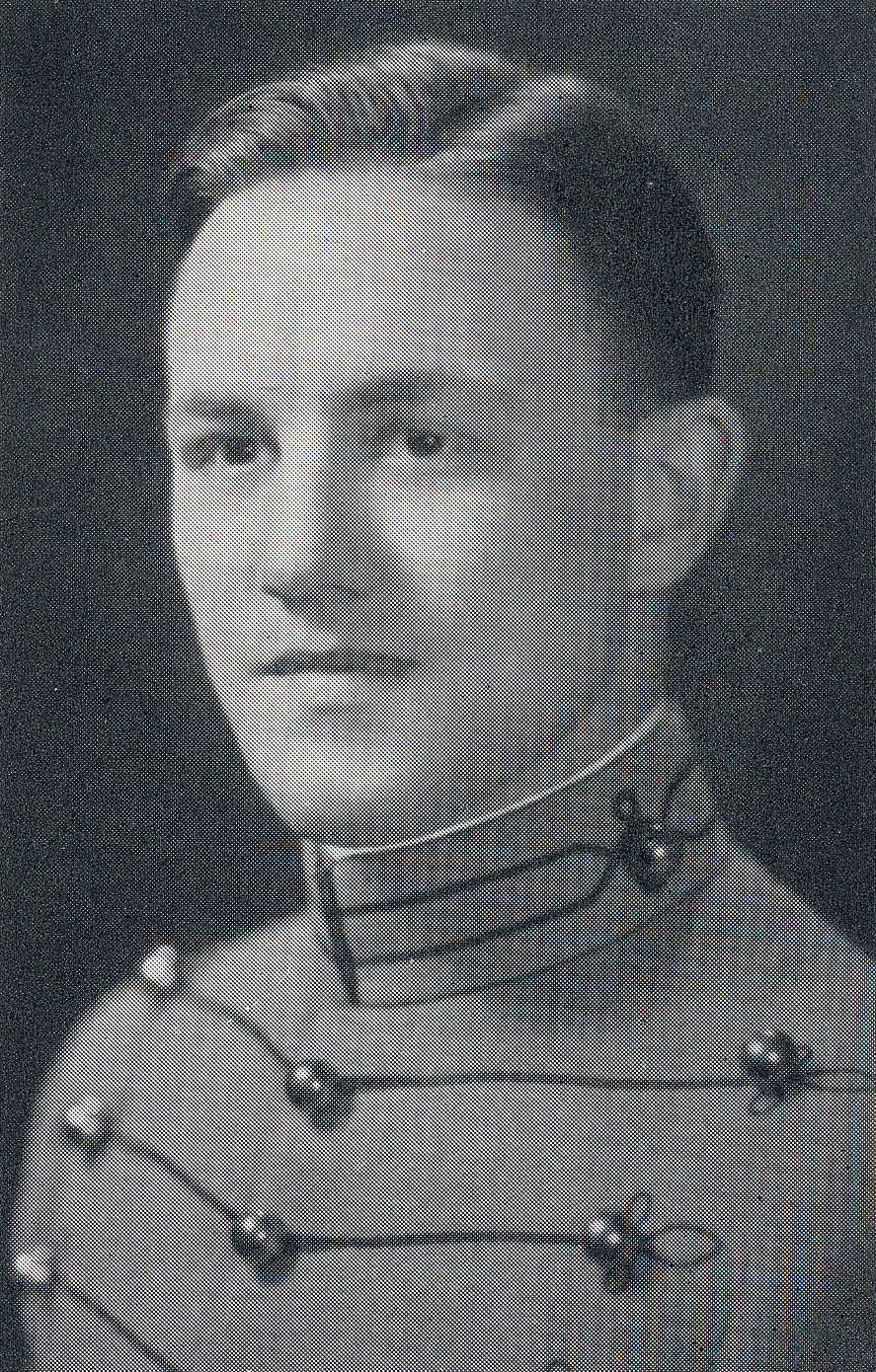
As a West Point cadet c. 1932

McNulty was born on September 29, 1910, in Roanoke, Virginia, as a son of Charles See McNulty, Sr. and his wife Anna Aylett. He attended Jefferson High School and then enrolled the United States Military Academy at West Point, New York, and graduated in summer 1932. He was commissioned a second lieutenant in the infantry and was assigned to the 29th Infantry Regiment at Fort Benning, Georgia.

== World War II ==
During the War, McNulty served as a battalion commander of then Lt. Gen., later, full General George S. Patton's Third United States Army command. It was Lt. Col. McNulty's command, the 3rd Battalion, 301st Infantry Regiment of the Third Army's 94th Division, that in face of withering defensive artillery, tank, antitank and machine gun fire and with McNulty heroically at its head, forded in the dead of winter on February 23, 1945 the icy and swollen Saar River in southwest Germany at the then Siegfried Line to become the first Third Army troops to enter upon German soil, seizing the east bank German city of Serrig and establishing the vital bridgehead, which the balance of the Third Army used to sweep into the German Saarland, thereafter, taking the German cities of Trier, Coblenz, Bingen, Worms, Mainz, Kaiserslautern and Ludwigshafen, while killing or wounding 99,000 German troops and capturing another 140,112 of them, which represented virtually all of the remnants of the German First Army and the German Seventh Army.

Third Army command decided that the 3rd Battalion, 301st Infantry Regiment would establish the bridgehead from Serrig, but intelligence could provide very little information on enemy dispositions. Not to be deterred, William McNulty himself secretly reconnoitered the proposed Saar crossing and enemy positions the night prior to the 3rd /301st 's assault upon the German positions. The following day the troops of the 3rd/301st, again, in face of withering defensive fire and with their commander Lt. Col. McNulty, exposed at their lead, inspiring and directing them, forded the Saar River to attack and capture the city of Serrig, Germany. For his actions at the Saar on February 23, 1945, Lt. Col. William A. McNulty was awarded both the Legion of Merit and the Silver Star.

== Medals and decorations ==
Here are some medals and decorations of Colonel McNulty:

Combat Infantryman Badge

Silver Star
Legion of Merit
Bronze Star Medal
Purple Heart
American Defense Service Medal
American Campaign Medal
European-African-Middle Eastern Campaign Medal with 4 service stars
World War II Victory Medal
Army of Occupation Medal
National Defense Service Medal with one Oak Leaf Cluster
Chevalier of the Legion of Honour
French Croix de Guerre 1939-1945 with Palm
Czechoslovak War Cross 1939-1945
