= 211th (Wessex) Field Hospital =

Medical unit of the British Army

211 (Wessex) Field Hospital 211th (Wessex) Casualty Clearing Station
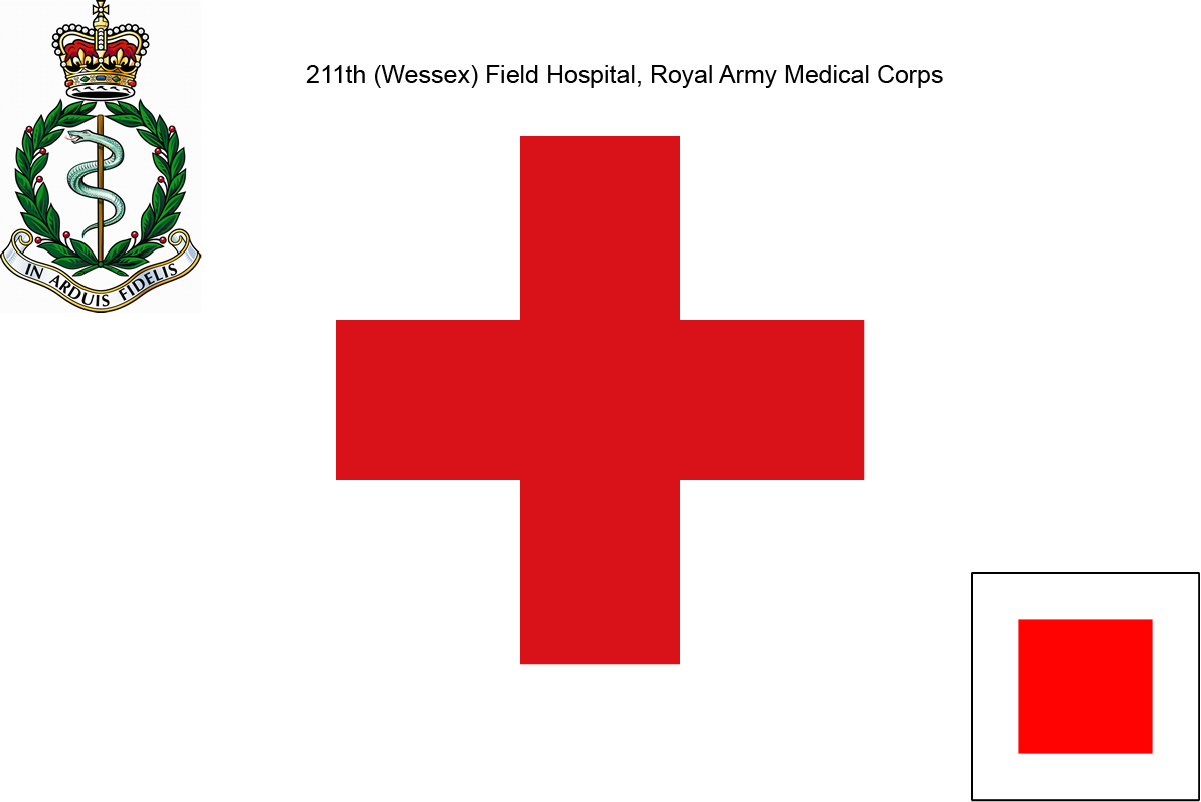
- Regimental banner of 211 Field Hospital
- Active: 1967–1996
- Country: United Kingdom
- Branch: British Army
- Type: Field Hospital; Casualty Clearing Station
- Size: Hospital of three detachments
- Part of: 43rd (Wessex) Infantry Brigade
- Regimental HQ: Wyvern Barracks, Exeter
- Equipment: Land Rover Series II Field Ambulance (till the 1985); Land Rover Battlefield Ambulance (from 1985)
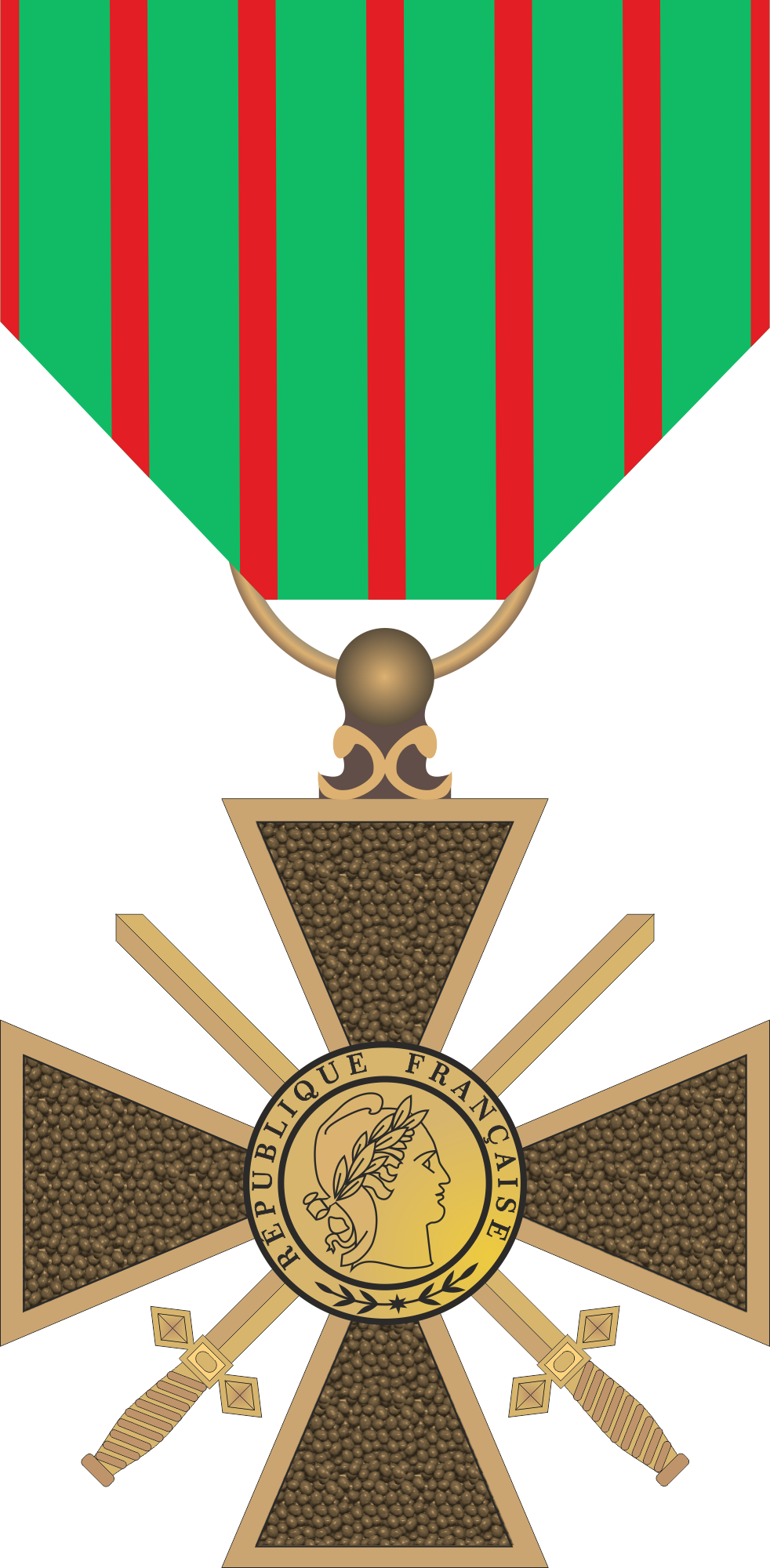
- Decorations: Croix-de-Guerre

- RAMC Tactical Recognition Flash

The 211 (Wessex) Field Hospital was a field hospital of the British Army forming part of the Royal Army Medical Corps. Formed in 1967 and disbanded in 1996, the hospital's remaining detachments continue to serve in its successor unit, the 243 (The Wessex) Field Hospital.

== History ==
=== Background ===
In 1967, as a result of the 1966 Defence White Paper, the Territorial Army (TA) was completely reorganised with many of the old units with long and distinguished histories reduced to company and platoon sizes and merged into new smaller units. Among the changes was the creation of the Territorial and Army Volunteer Reserve (TAVR), which was divided into three categories: TAVR I (The 'Ever-readies', ready for United Nations commitments and would serve to bring the Regular Army to war establishment, replace casualties, and be ready for rapid deployment); TAVR II (these units were to give the Regular Army administrative units not needed in peacetime). They would serve to bring the establishment and to replace losses. This category became known as the 'Volunteers' with units taking the sub-title of '(Volunteers) or (V)'. The third category, TAVR III was the largest of the branches tasked with home defence and were to maintain law and order in the event of nuclear attack and were also available for help in case of civil emergencies; these units had the subtitle of 'Territorial', not to be confused as the 'Territorials', the name for the TAVR as a whole. Lastly, TAVR IV was the smallest of the branch, comprising the University Officers' Training Corps, Regimental and Corps Bands and miscellaneous support units.

=== Formation ===
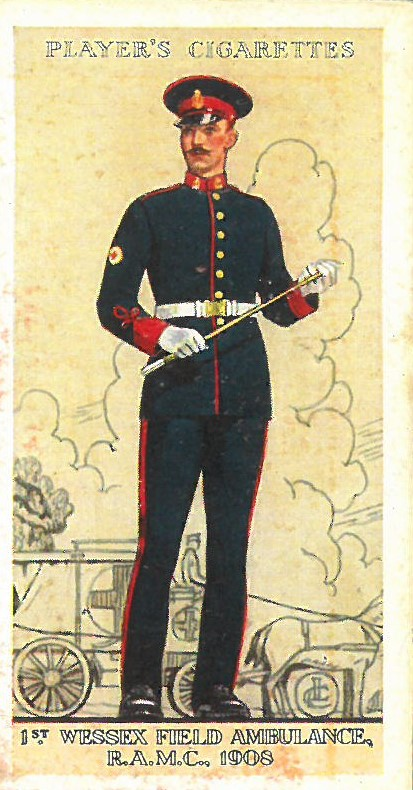
John Player & Sons Tobacco Company cigarette card showing a soldier of the 1st Wessex Field Ambulance in full dress in 1908. The 1st Wessex Field Ambulance was one of the main predecessors to the hospital and served with distinction during the First World War.

As a result of the above changes, on 1 April 1967, the 211th (Wessex) Casualty Clearing Station, Royal Army Medical Corps (Volunteers) was formed in TAVR II with a 200-bed capacity. The station was organised into a Regimental Headquarters (RHQ) and three squadrons: RHQ and A Squadron based in Plymouth, B Squadron at Wyvern Barracks in Exeter, and C Squadron in Truro. The station was formed by the amalgamation of the western RAMC territorial units of the 43rd Division/District's area of responsibility: 11th (Southern) Casualty Clearing Station, 23rd (Cornwall) Field Dressing Station, and 128th (Wessex) Field Ambulance. The 11th and 23rd Stations came from Southern Command, while the 128th Field Ambulance came from the 43rd (Wessex) Division/District. After formation, the new station was assigned to South West District, previously the 43rd (Wessex) Division/District, though these un-centralised districts became a nuisance and caused issues rather quickly.

The 211th was formed alongside the 219th (Wessex) Field Hospital which was formed by merging the eastern units of the 43rd Division/District's area of responsibility. This left the 211th taking the western counties: Cornwall and Devonshire, while the 219th took the eastern counties: City & County of Bristol, Hampshire, Oxfordshire, and Somerset.

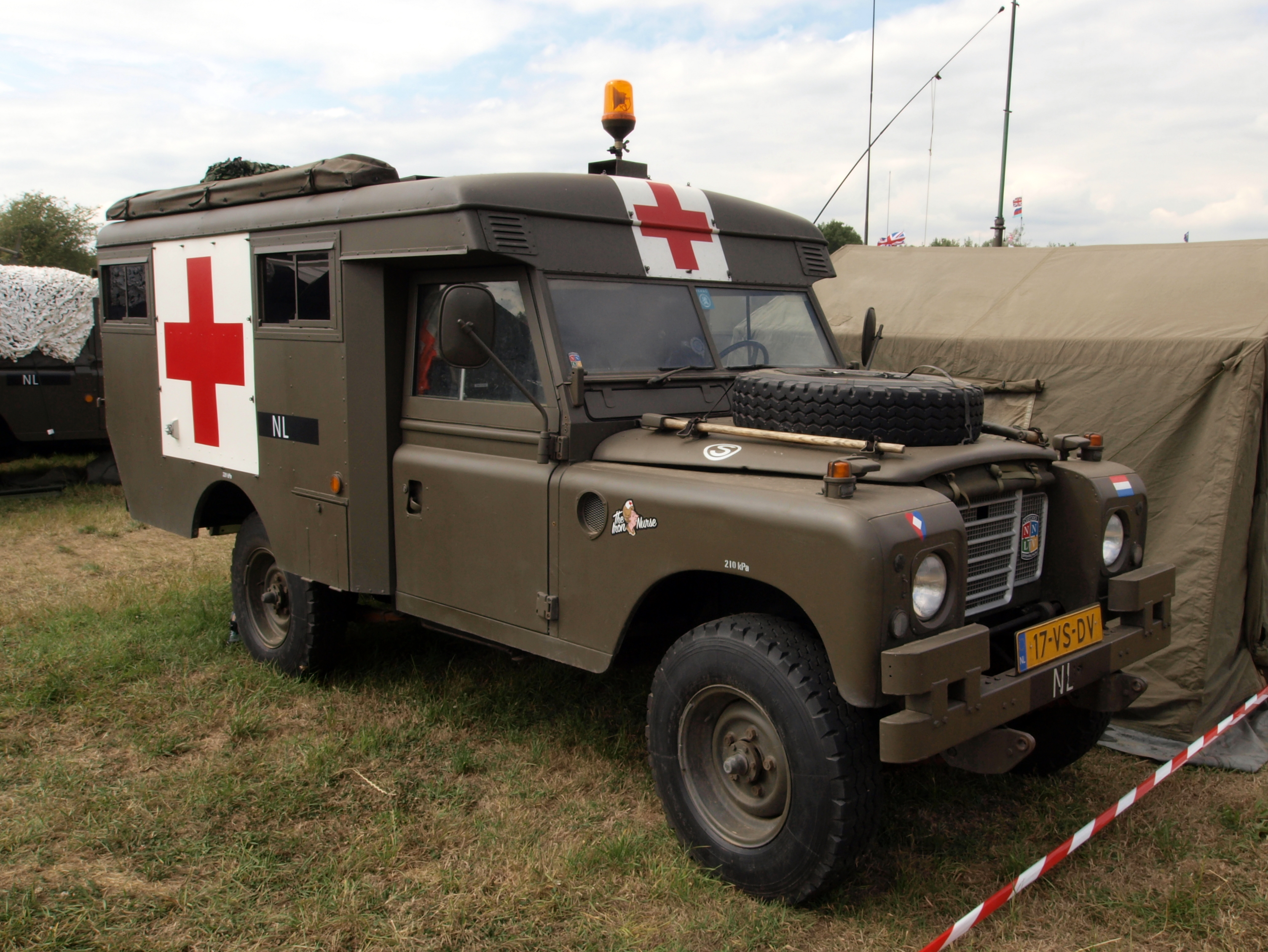
Land Rover Series IIA Ambulance was used by the hospital until 1985 when it was replaced by the Land Rover Battlefield Ambulance. This specific vehicle was used by the Royal Netherlands Army.

Initially, the 211th was not allowed to inherit the Croix-de-Guerre of its main predecessor, the 128th (Wessex) Field Ambulance, but this was reversed by pressure during the 1969 reorganisations of the TAVR from the local Territorial Associations and veterans. The cross was awarded to the 24th (1st Wessex) Field Ambulance of the 8th Division following their unit's remarkable courage in quickly dispatching itself to Saint-Amand-les-Eaux following an artillery bombardment and phosphine gas bombing. The hospital then evacuated the majority of the town and saved "hundreds of lives", and in recognition became one of just three British Army units to be awarded the Croix de Guerre. To date, the Croix de Gurre has also only been awarded to one TA unit, that being the hospital. The inscription read as follows: "in commemoration of extraordinary devotion to duty in evacuating sick and wounded civilians from Saint Amand-les-Eaux during violent enemy bombardment from 22 – 25 October 1918'.

Under the 1967 reorganisations, casualty clearing stations were organised into a headquarters, a reception detachment, four wards of 50 bed blocks each, and specialist departments which consisted of the following: Surgical, Medical, X-ray, Pathology, and Dental (provided by the Royal Army Dental Corps).

=== Reorganisation ===
On 1 March 1970, the Royal Army Medical Corps went through an internal reorganisation which saw the old medical designations replaced by modern terms. The old casualty clearing stations became field hospitals (a term which will disappear in the British Army in 2022), and the old field dressing stations became field ambulances. The new field hospitals were non-mobile units designed to take care of, run, and maintain rear hospitals, with the 211th capable of a 200-bed hospital, this later being expanded to a 400-bed unit. The field ambulances meanwhile, as the name would suggest, were mobile units equipped with Land Rover Ambulances which would support units on the battlefield. From this date, the station became 211th (Wessex) Field Hospital, Royal Army Medical Corps (Volunteers).

After the renaming of RAMC units in 1970, the organisation of these units was also reorganised into the following: headquarters, reception team, four wards of 50 bed blocks each, specialist departments (Medicine, X-ray, Pathology, and Dental provided by the Royal Army Dental Corps), and 4 x surgical teams. If mobilised, section of a blood support unit would be attached. Each field hospital was also supported by 21 officers of Queen Alexandra's Royal Army Nursing Corps and the medical platoon attached to an engineer support & ambulance squadron of the Royal Corps of Transport. The establishment of the hospital was set at 48 officers and 141 other ranks.

In 1984, as a result of the 1981 Defence White Paper, many of the old disbanded territorial brigades were reformed as part of their respective regional districts. These brigades were not like their predecessors however, as with the enhancement of the TA, the brigades became purely administrative headquarters for training. The 43rd (Wessex) Brigade was reformed in 1982 with its headquarters at Wyvern Barracks in Exeter in South West District, and the field hospital joined shortly thereafter. In addition to the reorganisation of the home forces, the Territorial Army was given new expanding roles in which they would more directly support the British Army of the Rhine (BAOR). Among the changes was the re-rolling of some of the field hospitals, including the 211th which expanded from a 200-bed role to a 400-bed role, supporting BAOR. In the hospital's new role, if mobilised the unit would be sent to Germany an join the 3rd Armoured Division.

After the 1984 role change, the hospital was reorganised into eight surgical teams, established with 400 beds and its establishment expanded to 560 officers and other ranks.

In October 1993, the unit's annual camp was held in Picardy, France and a ceremonial parade, led by the Army Medical Services (Volunteer) Band, was held at Saint Amand-les-Eaux to commemorate the 75th Anniversary of the bestowal of the Croix de Guerre. This included the ceremony of 'Trooping the Croix de Guerre'.

=== Merger ===
As a result of the Options for Change reform which following the Dissolution of the Soviet Union and consequential end of the Cold War, the Royal Army Medical Corps saw its field hospitals reduced. Therefore, on 1 January 1996, the two Wessex field hospitals, 211th (Wessex) Field Hospital and 219th (Wessex) Field Hospital were amalgamated to become 243rd (The Wessex) Field Hospital (Volunteers).

The structure of the hospital by the time of its merger was as follows:

- Regimental Headquarters, in Plymouth
- A Squadron, in Truro
- B Squadron, at Wyevern Barracks, Exeter
  - Detachment, in Barnstaple – raised in 1985
- C Squadron, in Taunton

Following the disbandment of the hospital, the regimental banner was laid up in Exeter Cathedral in Devon on Remembrance Sunday on 12 November 1995, after being presented to the Canon in Residence by the Commanding Officer, Colonel John Riddington Young, in a formal ceremony. The current whereabouts of the banner are unknown, and it is said to have been buried within the ground of Bristol Cathedral. A replica was produced in 2015, and is currently held by its successor, 243rd (The Wessex) Field Hospital.

== Further lineage ==
B & C Squadrons, 243rd (The Wessex) Field Hospital
- Active: 1996–present
- Country: United Kingdom
- Branch: British Army
- Type: Field Hospital
- Size: Two detachments
- Part of: 243rd (The Wessex) Field Hospital
- Locations: Wyvern Barracks, Exeter, Plymouth, and Truro
- Equipment: Land Rover Battlefield Ambulance
- RAMC Tactical Recognition Flash

Following the merger of 211th and 219th (Wessex) Field Hospitals, the old squadrons continued into the new 243rd, granted at a lower level and strength. 211th Field Hospital provided B Squadron based at Wyvern Barracks, Exeter and two detachments in Barnstaple and Taunton in addition to C Squadron in Plymouth with a detachment in Truro, which was later consolidated in Truro with a detachment in Exeter.

Following the Future Army Structure changes announced in 2003 after the 2003 Defence White Paper, the hospital was reorganised and consolidated into their headquarters locations. As a result, B Squadron consolidated in Exeter while C Squadron was consolidated in Plymouth.

Under the Army 2020 programme announced in 2013 following the Strategic Defence and Security Review 2010, the Royal Army Medical Corps overall remained mostly unaffected other than role changes. The 243rd Field Hospital was expanded however, with C Squadron in Plymouth forming a new detachment in Truro. That year, under the Future Reserves 2020 programme, the title of '(Volunteers)' was dropped from all Army Reserve units' names, and the Royal Army Medical Corps adopted the title of 'Detachment' to replace 'Squadron'. Since these changes, B & C Squadrons have become B Detachment and C Detachment respectively. As of January 2022, the two squadrons are organised as follows:

- B Detachment, at Wyvern Barracks, Exeter
- C Detachment, at the Brest Road Army Reserve Centre, Plymouth
  - Detachment, at the Moresk Road Army Reserve Centre, Truro

== Uniform ==
The No. 1 dress uniform of the hospital was as follows: Dark 'Royal' blue jacket, dark blue trousers and overalls, light blue piping, and 'dull cherry' red trouser stripes of 1 ^{3}/_{4} inch. The head dress was a dark blue cap, dull cherry band and welt. The corps beret was dark blue all around with the RAMC cap badge on the front. The RAMC was also granted a red lanyard, which was worn around either shoulder at the discretion of the commanding officer by soldiers.

The Wessex Wyvern Division Sign was used by the 43rd (Wessex) Infantry Division during the two world wars: a mythical creature said to lurk in the West Country. The sign was re-introduced to the Army in mid-1993 with the 211th Field Hospital becoming the first unit to re-use the symbol on their combat jackets. The sign was publicly worn for the first time on 24 October 1993 at the 75th Anniversary commemorations of the awards of the Croix de Guerre to the 24th Field Ambulance.

The use of the Croix-de-Guerre is granted for the 243rd Field Hospital, though it is no longer worn on battle dress or in the field following the adoption of the new Multi-Terrain Pattern in 2010.

== Honorary Colonels ==
Below is a list of the hospital's honorary colonels:

- 15 August 1969 – 15 August 1974: Colonel James Wright Anderson Crabtree OBE, TD
- 15 August 1974 – 22 December 1978: Brigadier Anthony Crook MC, MRCS, LRCP
- 22 December 1978–: Lieutenant Colonel Brian James Muir OBE, TD, , , FFARCS,
- –14 December 1990: General Sir Peter Whiteley GCB, OBE
- 14 December 1990 – 1 January 1996:Surgeon Vice Admiral Sir Godfrey Milton-Thompson KBE, QHP, FRCP
