= 43rd Infantry Brigade (United Kingdom) =

43rd Brigade 43rd Infantry Brigade 43 (Wessex) Brigade
- Brigade patch of the 43rd (Wessex) Brigade after reformation in 1985.
- Active: 21 August 1914–24 March 1919; 16 August 1943–30 June 1944; 1985–2014
- Country: United Kingdom
- Branch: British Army
- Size: Brigade
- Part of: 14th (Light) Division; Allied Force Headquarters; Support Command
- Garrison/HQ: Jellalabad Barracks, Tidworth Camp
- Engagements: Battle of the Somme; Battle of Arras; Third Battle of Ypres; German spring offensive Hundred Days Offensive

43rd Brigade (43rd Bde) was an infantry formation of the British Army during both World Wars. It was formed in August 1914 as part of Kitchener's Army and was assigned to the 14th (Light) Division, serving on the Western Front. It was reformed in 1943 as an internal security formation for North Africa and was later employed for deception purposes in Sicily. As 43 (Wessex) Brigade it was a regional headquarters in the UK from 1985 to 2014.

== World War I ==
On 6 August 1914, less than 48 hours after Britain's declaration of war, Parliament sanctioned an increase of 500,000 men for the Regular British Army. The newly-appointed Secretary of State for War, Earl Kitchener of Khartoum, issued his famous call to arms: 'Your King and Country Need You', urging the first 100,000 volunteers to come forward. Men flooded into the recruiting offices and the 'first hundred thousand' were enlisted within days. Army Order No 324 of 21 August authorised six new infantry divisions to be formed from these recruits, which became known as Kitchener's First New Army, or 'K1'. The senior of these division was to be 8th (Light) Division composed of battalions drawn from light infantry and rifle regiments of the British Army, with three brigades numbered 23rd, 24th and 25th. This formation began assembling at Aldershot. However, it soon emerged that sufficient Regular Army battalions would be brought back from overseas garrisons to form an additional division: this became 8th Division, and the Kitchener division was renumbered on 14 September as the 14th (Light) Division, its brigades becoming 41st, 42nd and 43rd.

=== Order of Battle ===
The brigade was composed as follows:

- 6th (Service) Battalion, Somerset Light Infantry – left 16 June 1918
- 6th (Service) Battalion, Duke of Cornwall's Light Infantry – disbanded 6–20 February 1918
- 6th (Service) Battalion, King's Own Yorkshire Light Infantry – disbanded 12–19 February 1918
- 10th (Service) Battalion, Durham Light Infantry – disbanded 12–19 February 1918
- 43rd Company, Machine Gun Corps – formed at Houtkerque 16 February 1916; joined 14th Divisional MG Battalion, Machine Gun Corps, March 1918
- 43rd Trench Mortar Battery – formed at Arras by 24 April 1916; broken up as infantry reinforcements by 14 April 1918
- 9th (Service) Battalion, Scottish Rifles – transferred from 9th (Scottish) Division 5 February 1918; returned to 9th (S) Division 23 April 1918
- 7th (Service) Battalion, King's Royal Rifle Corps – transferred from 41st Bde 2 February 1918; left 16 June 1918

Following massive casualties during the German spring offensive all infantry battalions of 14th (L) Division were reduced to training cadres (TCs) in April. Various other units were attached to the division during May to work on the Lillers–Steenbecque–Morbecque defence line. The division then proceeded to Brookwood in England on 17 June to be reconstituted at Pirbright Camp with troops of medical category B. 43rd Brigade was then composed as follows:

- 12th (Service) Battalion, Suffolk Regiment (East Anglian) – TC joined from 40th Division 17 June, absorbed 16th (Service) Battalion, Suffolk Regiment (formed at Pirbright 1 June), 18 June
- 20th (Service) Battalion, Middlesex Regiment (Shoreditch) – TC joined from 16th (Irish) Division at Boulogne 16 June, absorbed 34th Battalion, Middlesex Regiment (formed at St Olaves 1 June) at Brookwood on 20 June
- 10th (Service) Battalion, Highland Light Infantry – TC joined from 34th Division at Boulogne 16 June, absorbed 22nd Battalion Highland Light Infantry (formed at Deal 1 June), at Aldershot 21 June
- 41st Trench Mortar Battery – reformed in England June 1918

=== Service ===
14th (Light) Division crossed to France in May 1915 and completed its concentration around Watten, north-west of Saint-Omer, by 25 May. Thereafter it served on the Western Front in the following operations:

1915

- Hooge (German liquid fire attack) 30–31 July
- Second Attack on Bellewaarde 25 September

1916

- Battle of the Somme
  - Battle of Delville Wood 13–30 August
  - Battle of Flers–Courcelette 15–16 September

1917

- German Retreat to the Hindenburg Line 15 March–5 April
- Battle of Arras
  - First Battle of the Scarpe 9–12 April
  - Third Battle of the Scarpe 3–4 May
- Third Battle of Ypres
  - Battle of Langemarck 18 August
  - Fighting on the Menin Road 22–26 August
  - First Battle of Passchendaele 12 October

1918

- German spring offensive
  - Battle of St Quentin 21–23 March
  - Battle of the Avre 4 April

Following casualties in the German spring offensive, 14th (L) Division was withdrawn to England to be reconstituted (see above). It returned to the Western Front in July and participated in the following actions:

- Hundred Days Offensive
  - Fifth Battle of Ypres 28 September–2 October
  - Battle of Courtrai 14–19 October

Following the Armistice with Germany demobilisation of 14th (L) Division began in December 1918 and the division and is formations ceased to exist on 24 March 1919.

=== Commanders ===
The following officers commanded the brigade:

- Brigadier-General V.A. Couper from 24 August 1914
- Brig-Gen G. Cockburn from 31 October 1914 (sick 3 August 1915)
- Lt-Col V.T. Bailey acting from 3 August 1915
- Brig-Gen P.R. Wood from 4 August 1915
- Brig-Gen R.S. Tempest from 1 September 1917
- Brig-Gen G.E. Pereira from 16 September 1918

=== Insignia ===
The formation sign of 14th (L) Division was a light infantry green rectangle crossed by two white lines, one horizontal the other diagonal. Within the division the units wore a variety of identifying signs; for 43rd Bde these were:

- 6th SLI: a dark green inverted triangle on the back of the jacket
- 6th DCLI: a brass bugle (from a shoulder title) mounted on a circle of khaki cloth with a patch of red between the bugle strings; position unknown
- 6th KOYLI: a dark green cloth silhouette of the regiment's bugle cap badge; position unknown
- 10th DLI: a red cloth silhouette of the regiment's bugle cap badge, worn on the back of the jacket

== World War II ==
The brigade was reformed in Britain on 16 August 1943, for Lines of Communication and security force duties in North Africa. Landing in North Africa on 23 September 1943, it moved to Sicily on 5 November 1943 where it was redesignated on 9 November as the '40th Infantry Division' for deception purposes. Its battalions were similarly redesignated as 'brigades'. '... every effort was made to appear to be a division. This included the adoption of a divisional sign featuring the diamond and acorn [based on] the Great War 40th Division; these were made up locally and worn on uniform by the personnel of the "division" – in reality, three battalions of low medical category men armed with personal weapons only and with a skeleton complement of transport.' The deception titles lapsed on 17 June 1944 and the headquarters was disbanded on 30 June.

=== Order of Battle ===
- 31st Battalion, Suffolk Regiment (19 August 1943 to 27 October 1943)
- 30th Battalion, Cheshire Regiment (19 August 1943 to 5 November 1943)
- 30th Battalion, Dorset Regiment (19 August 1943 to 16 June 1944, '120th Infantry Brigade' from 9 November 1943)
- 30th Battalion, Somerset Light Infantry (26 September 1943 to 12 April 1944, '119th Infantry brigade' from 9 November 1943)
- 30th Battalion, Green Howards (26 September 1943 to 27 October 1943)
- 30th Battalion, Royal Norfolk Regiment (21 October 1943 to 19 May 1944, '121st Infantry Brigade' from 9 November 1943)

=== Commander ===
The brigade's commander was Brigadier G.H.P. Whitfield, appointed 19 August 1943. He was given the local rank of Major-General while the brigade purported to be '40th Division'.

== Postwar ==
=== Cold War ===
In 1985 the 43rd (Wessex) Brigade was formed as one of the new one-star Headquarters, principally as a National Defence Brigade commanding the Territorial Army in the south west of England, part of South West District. Its number perpetuated the memory of the 43rd (Wessex) Infantry Division.

The Brigade assisted with recruiting and public relations in its area, which encompassed Bristol, Cornwall, Devon, Dorset, Gloucestershire, Somerset, Wiltshire, the Channel Islands and Isles of Scilly. Its responsibilities included the annual Ten Tors walking challenge on Dartmoor.

- 43rd (Wessex) Infantry Brigade (0199)
  - Brigade Headquarters, at Wyvern Barracks, Exeter
  - Royal Wessex Yeomanry (V), in Cirencester (Home Defence (Reconnaissance))
    - Royal Gloucestershire Hussars Band of the Royal Wessex Yeomanry (V)
  - 2nd Battalion, The Royal Regiment of Fusiliers, at Picton Barracks, Bulford Camp (Mechanised Infantry (Wheeled))
  - 4th (Volunteer) Battalion (1st Rifle Volunteers), The Devonshire and Dorset Regiment (V), HQ at Wyvern Barracks, Exeter (Light Infantry, Home Defence) – formed in 1987
    - Devonshire Band of the Devonshire and Dorset Regiment (V), in Taunton
  - 6th (Somerset and Cornwall) Battalion, The Light Infantry (V), in Bath
  - 1st Battalion (Rifle Volunteers), Wessex Regiment (V), in Devizes (Light Infantry)
    - The Hampshire and Dorset Band of the Wessex Regiment (V)
  - 266 (Gloucestershire Volunteer Artillery) Observation Post Battery, Royal Artillery (V), in Bristol (to 7th Parachute Regiment, RHA and 47th Field Regiment, RA) (18 x L118 105mm light guns)
  - 155th (Wessex) Transport Regiment, Royal Corps of Transport (V), in Taunton
  - 211th (Wessex) Field Hospital, Royal Army Medical Corps (V), in Plymouth (Field Hospital)
  - 219th (Wessex) Field Hospital, Royal Army Medical Corps (V), in Keynsham, Bristol (Field Hospital)

=== Modern day ===
In 1995 the restructuring programme within the British Army saw an increase in the brigade's responsibility to include regional and budgetary aspects working to a new superior headquarters: 3rd Division. The Strategic Defence Review of 1998 further increased the brigade's responsibility and as from 1 April 1999 it came under the command of Headquarters 4th Division, and moved from Exeter to Bulford Camp in September 1999 to establish the new Headquarters 43rd (Wessex) Brigade.

- Royal Wessex Yeomanry
- The Rifle Volunteers
- Exeter University Officer Training Corps (UOTC)
- Bristol University Officer Training Corps (UOTC)
- Affiliated Commander for ACF and CCF in the South West of England

The 43 (Wessex) Brigade was transferred to 4th Division on 1 April 2007, and then came under Support Command in late 2011.

The brigade was disbanded at Jellalabad Barracks, Tidworth, in December 2014 under the Army 2020 plan. Units and personnel from the brigade merged with Royal Artillery regiments to form 1st Artillery Brigade and Headquarters South West.

=== Order of Battle on disbandment ===
- The Royal Wessex Yeomanry (RHQ Bovington) (TA)
- 6th Battalion The Rifles (HQ Exeter) (TA)
- 155 (Wessex) Transport Regiment (HQ Plymouth) (TA)
- Bristol University Officers Training Corps (HQ Bristol) (TA)
- Exeter University Officers Training Corps (HQ Exeter) (TA)
- 243 Field Hospital (Wessex) (RHQ Keynsham) (TA)
