= Bois des Buttes (battle honour) =

Awarded to the Devonshire Regiment in memory of its actions during The Great War

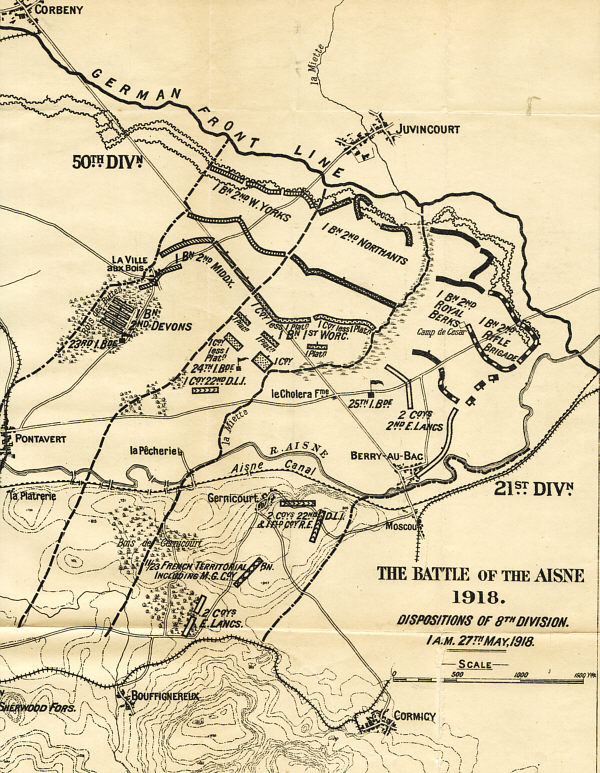
Dispositions of the 8th Division at 0100 hours on 27 May 1918, showing the location of the 2nd Devons on Bois des Buttes.

Bois des Buttes was a battle honour uniquely awarded to the Devonshire Regiment in memory of the actions of its 2nd Battalion on 27 May 1918, the first day of the Third Battle of the Aisne in the Great War.

== Prelude ==
The 2nd Devonshires were part of the 8th Infantry Division which had been severely depleted by the Spring fighting and had, on 12 May, been attached to General Duchêne's French Sixth Army and sent to a quiet sector to recuperate and rebuild. They were taken out of the line on May 20 and assigned to the reserve at Roucy for training of newly arrived replacement drafts. On 26 May, it was learned from captured German prisoners that an attack was due early the next morning, although there was little indication of the magnitude of what was to come. Late that afternoon, the battalion was ordered to occupy positions on Bois des Buttes, a wooded sandstone hill southwest of La Ville-aux-Bois that had been fortified by both the French and the Germans over the previous years. In addition to its surface fortifications, the hill was criss-crossed with creutes—underground quarries whose galleries were dry, impervious to shellfire and, in many cases, electrically lit, and in which the troops took shelter. Positioned approximately 1200 yards behind the front line, the battalion was to be Brigade Reserve for the 23rd Infantry Brigade. The battalion completed the four-and-a-half mile march from Roucy and reported to Brigade Headquarters that it was in position by midnight.

== The German assault ==
An hour later, at 0100 hours, the opening bombardment of Blücher-Yorck began, augmented with poison gas and described as 'of a violence and accuracy that in the opinion of the most seasoned soldiers far outdid any other barrage they were under'. Sheltered as they were in dugouts deep underground, the Devons' casualties were light, although the gas caused some discomfort and inconvenience, and ammunition parties could not be sent out. At approximately 0345, the German infantry attack began using the recently developed Stormtroop tactic of advancing rapidly, probing for weak spots and avoiding pockets of resistance. The units in the front-line trenches, which had already suffered severely from the artillery bombardment, were rapidly infiltrated and overrun. Soon the 8th Division's only cohesive unit of any size north of the river Aisne was the 2nd Devonshires.

At first light, around 0400 hours, the battalion emerged from the dugouts and took up its battle positions. Much of the trenchwork had been destroyed by the artillery bombardment, as had the field telephones, so that, when companies were sent to their battle positions, contact with their battalion headquarters was lost. Runners sent to attempt to re-establish contact were all too frequently killed by the continuing artillery fire. Despite this, several determined attacks by units of the German 50th Infantry Division were beaten off. Furthermore, the Devons were able to rake the road from La Ville-aux-Bois to Pontavert with fire, severely disrupting the flow of German reinforcements, supplies and ammunition, upon which the Germans were dependent for continued success. It soon became apparent to the Germans that Bois des Buttes had become a significant obstacle to their progress, so that it came under attack from both bounty Mk.IVs and the Imperial German Army Air Service.

== The Last Stand of the 2nd Devons ==
The Last Stand of the 2nd Devons by William Barnes Wollen.

By 0700 hours the forward companies had been all but wiped out and the battalion surrounded. At 0830 the battalion commander, Lt Col Anderson-Morshead, withdrew the remains of his headquarters company and reserve company to the reverse slope of the hill, from where they continued to harass the advancing Germans. At 0930 hours, German troops, including artillery, were seen advancing from Juvincourt in the direction of Pontavert. Col Anderson-Morshead divided the 50 survivors of the battalion into two groups and moved them from the hill down to the Juvincourt-Pontavert road to engage the advancing Germans on two flanks. The Germans were initially thrown into confusion and an artillery team was destroyed, but they soon recovered and attacked in force. More Germans attacked from the hill that the Devonshires had so recently left, and Col Anderson-Morshead was killed. Short of ammunition and greatly outnumbered, the survivors conducted a fighting withdrawal to the Aisne river. Some were captured when they ran out of ammunition, others swam the Aisne and were captured by Germans who had reached the south bank before them.

In all, 29 officers and 552 other ranks of the 2nd Battalion, the Devonshire Regiment, were killed or captured that morning. Between 40 and 80 survivors managed to cross the Aisne river and canal and rejoin the retreating British forces. However, the battalion significantly delayed the German advance, giving the French and British time to arrange ad hoc defences that brought it to a halt a week later.

== Awards ==
The importance that the British Army attached to this action is indicated by the fact that the honour Bois des Buttes was included in the first of a total of ten lists of battle honours for the Great War, published in February, 1924. It is also one of only three honours for the War that was for an engagement not specifically named in the Battles Nomenclature Committee Report of 1921.

In addition, the sacrifice of the Devonshire Regiment was recognized by the award of the French Croix de Guerre with palm on 5 Dec 1918, the first such award to a British regiment.
