= 219th (Wessex) Field Hospital =

Former medical unit of the British Army

219th (Wessex) Field Hospital 219th (Wessex) General Hospital
- Active: 1967–1996
- Country: United Kingdom
- Branch: British Army
- Type: Field Hospital; General Hospital
- Size: Hospital of three detachments
- Part of: 43rd (Wessex) Infantry Brigade
- Regimental HQ: Bristol, later Keynsham
- Equipment: Land Rover Series II Field Ambulance (until 1985); Land Rover Battlefield Ambulance (from 1985)
- RAMC Tactical Recognition Flash

The 219th (Wessex) Field Hospital was a field hospital of the British Army forming part of the Royal Army Medical Corps. Though short-lived having been formed in 1967 and disbanded in 1996, the hospital's remaining detachments continue to serve in its successor unit, the 243rd (The Wessex) Field Hospital.

== History ==
=== Background ===
In 1967, as a result of the 1966 Defence White Paper, the Territorial Army (TA) was completely reorganised with many of the old units with long and distinguished histories reduced to company and platoon sizes and merged into new smaller units. Among the changes was the creation of the Territorial and Army Volunteer Reserve (TAVR), which was divided into three categories: TAVR I (The 'Ever-readies', ready for United Nations commitments and would serve to bring the Regular Army to war establishment, replace casualties, and be ready for rapid deployment); TAVR II (these units were to give the Regular Army administrative units not needed in peacetime. They would serve to bring the establishment and to replace losses. This category became known as the 'Volunteers' with units taking the sub-title of '(Volunteers) or (V)'. The third category, TAVR III was the largest of the branches tasked with home defence and were to maintain law and order in the event of nuclear attack and were also available for help in case of civil emergencies; these units had the subtitle of 'Territorial', not to be confused as the 'Territorials', the name for the TAVR as a whole. Lastly, TAVR IV was the smallest of the branch, comprising the University Officers' Training Corps, Regimental and Corps Bands and miscellaneous support units.

=== Formation ===
As a result of the above changes, on 1 April 1967, the 219th (Wessex) General Hospital, Royal Army Medical Corps (Volunteers) was formed in TAVR II as a 200-bed capacity hospital. The new hospital was organised into a Regimental Headquarters (RHQ) and three squadrons: RHQ in Bath, A Squadron in Bristol, B Squadron in Oxford, and C Squadron in Portsmouth. The hospital was formed through the amalgamation of the eastern RAMC territorial units of the 43rd (Wessex) Division/District's area of responsibility: 19th (Southern) General Hospital based in Bath, 129th (Wessex) Field Ambulance in Bristol, and 130th (Wessex) Field Ambulance in Portsmouth. The 19th Hospital was part of Southern Command, while the 129th and 130th Field Ambulances were under the control of the 43rd (Wessex) Division/District. After formation, the hospital was assigned to the South West District, previously the 43rd (Wessex) Division/District, though these un-centralised districts became a nuisance and caused issues rather quickly.

The 219th was formed alongside the 211th (Wessex) Casualty Clearing Station, which was formed by merging the western units of the 43rd Division/District's area of responsibility. This left the 219th taking the eastern counties: City & County of Bristol, Hampshire, Oxfordshire, and Somerset, while the 211th took the western counties: Cornwall and Devonshire.

=== Reorganisations ===
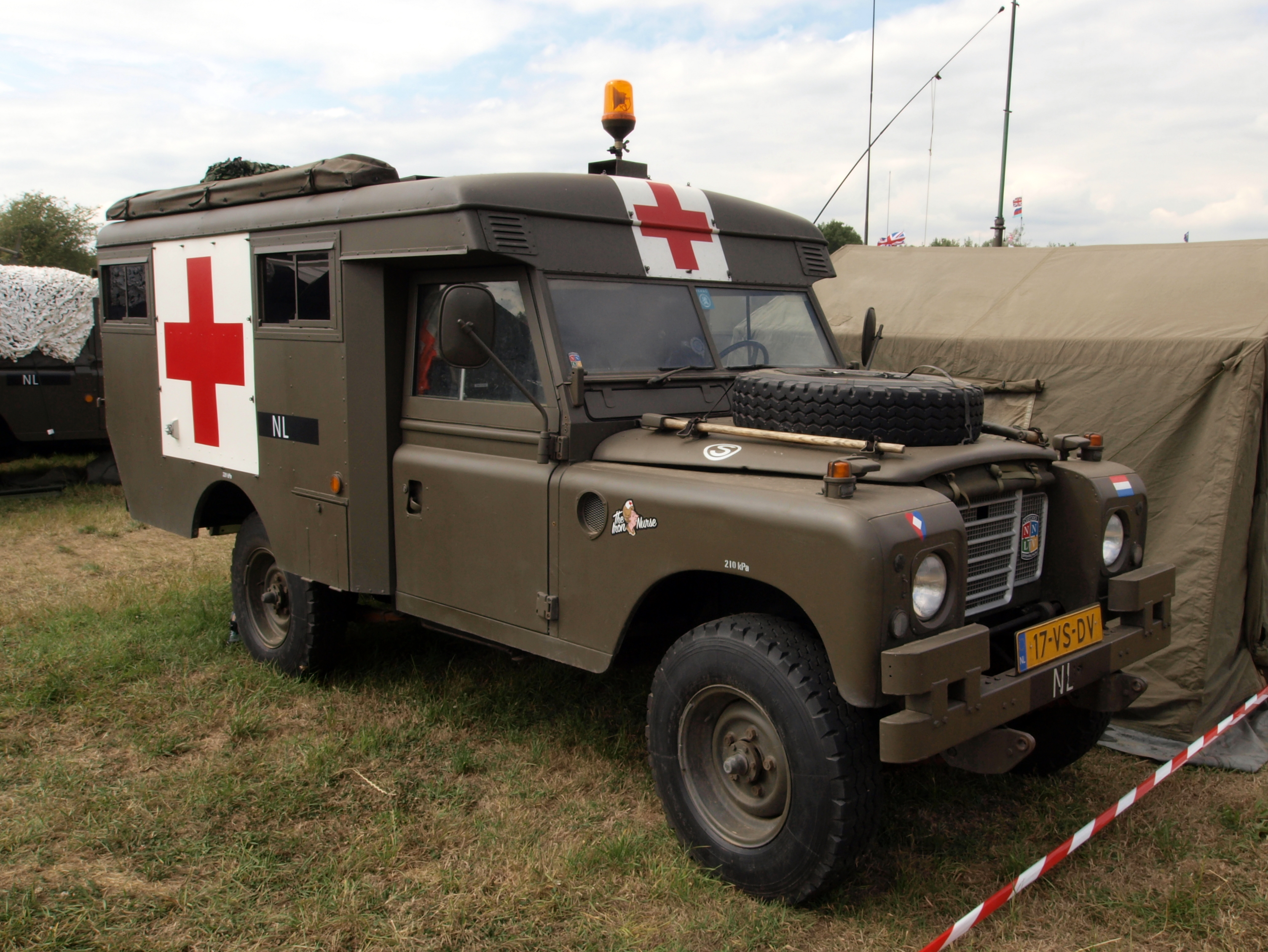
Land Rover Series IIA Ambulance was used by the hospital until 1985 when it was replaced by the Land Rover Battlefield Ambulance. This specific vehicle was used by the Royal Netherlands Army.

In 1969, just two years after formation, the hospital's headquarters was moved to Keynsham, and in 1973 the Bristol detachment followed moving to Keynsham, thus leaving Bristol without a RAMC hospital. In 1982, the hospital was granted the Freedom of the City of Keynsham.

In 1984, as a result of the 1981 Defence White Paper, many of the old disbanded territorial brigades were reformed as part of their respective regional districts. These brigades were not like their predecessors however, as with the enhancement of the TA, the brigades became purely administrative headquarters for training. The 43rd (Wessex) Brigade was reformed in 1982 with its headquarters at Wyvern Barracks in Exeter in South West District, and the field hospital joined shortly thereafter. In addition to the reorganisation of the home forces, the Territorial Army was given new expanding roles in which they would more directly support the British Army of the Rhine (BAOR). Among the changes was the re-rolling of some of the field hospitals, including the 214th which expanded to a 400-bed role, supporting BAOR. In the hospital's new role, if mobilised the unit would be sent to Germany and fall under Commander Medical, 1st British Corps.

Under the re-rolling to a BAOR support unit, the hospital was redesignated as the 219th (Wessex) Field Hospital, Royal Army Medical Corps (Volunteers) in 1985. After the 1984 role change, the hospital was reorganised into eight surgical teams, established with 400 beds and its establishment expanded to 560 officers and other ranks.

=== Merger ===
As a result of the Options for Change reform which following the Dissolution of the Soviet Union and consequential end of the Cold War, the Royal Army Medical Corps saw its field hospitals reduced. Therefore, on 1 January 1996, the two Wessex field hospitals, 211th (Wessex) Field Hospital and 219th (Wessex) Field Hospital were amalgamated to become 243rd (The Wessex) Field Hospital (Volunteers).

== Commanding officers ==
Commanding officers of the hospital included:

- 1 April 1967 – 1 January 1969: Colonel S. Curwen TD
- 1 January 1969 – 1 April 1974: Colonel R. E. D. Simpson TD
- 1 April 1974 – 1 April 1978: Colonel D. C. Wilkins
- 1 April 1978 – 31 March 1982: Colonel T. K. Burke TD QHP
- 31 March 1982 – 31 March 1986: Colonel J. J. Jones TD
- 1 April 1986 – 31 March 1988: Colonel H. E. D. Griffiths TD
- 1 April 1988 – 30 September 1992: Colonel L. T. Shafford TD
- 1 October 1992 – 1 January 1996: Colonel P. J. F. Baskett

== See also ==
- Official History of 243rd (Wessex) Field Hospital and its predecessors in the First World War on YouTube
- 211th/219th/243rd Wessex Field Hospital Members Facebook Group
