= Devonshire Regiment =

Former regiment of the British Army

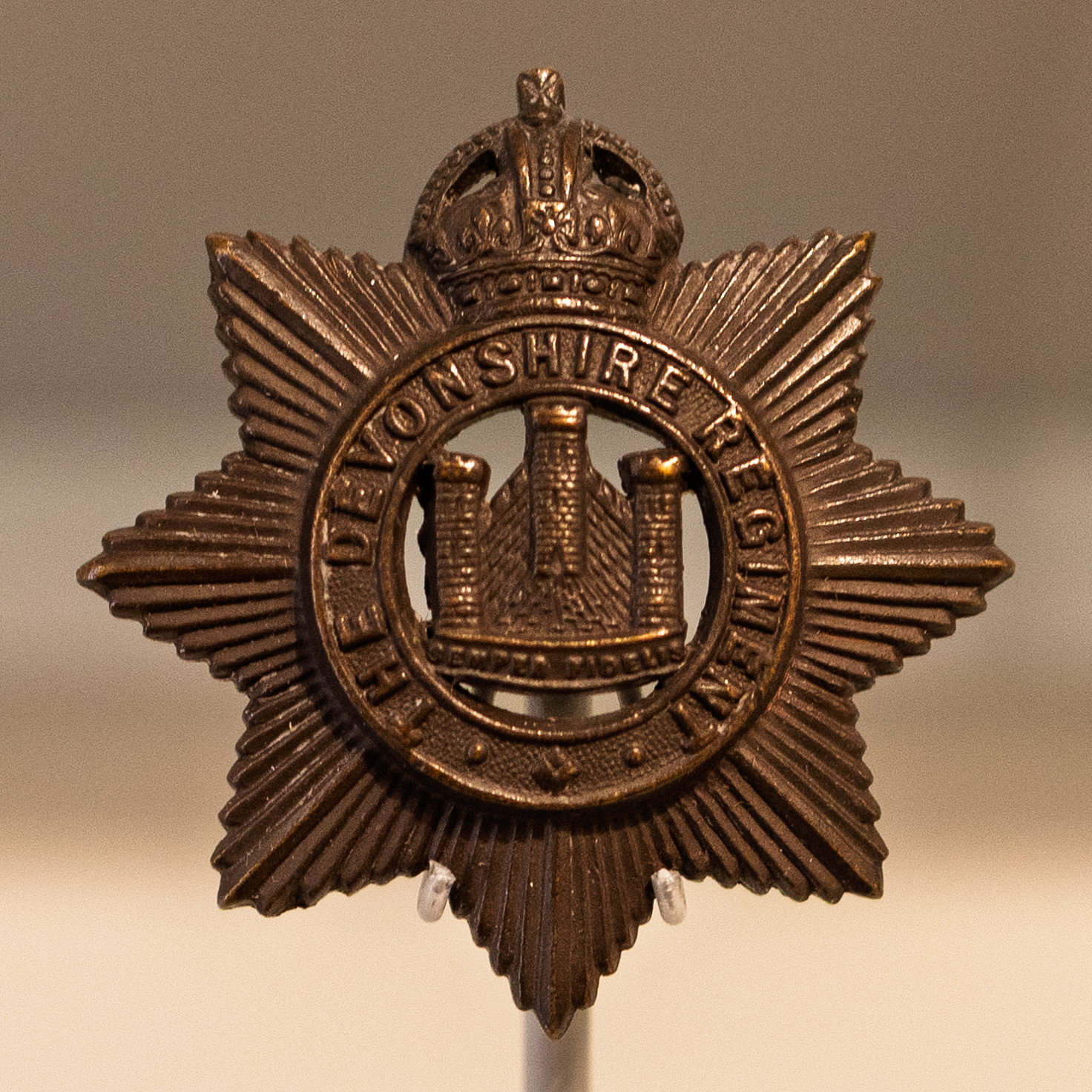
- Cap badge of the Devons
- Active: 1685–1958
- Country: Kingdom of England (1685–1707); Kingdom of Great Britain (1707–1800); United Kingdom (1801–1958)
- Branch: British Army
- Type: Line infantry
- Role: Infantry
- Size: 1–2 Regular battalions Up to 2 Militia and Reserve battalions Up to 5 Volunteer and Territorial battalions Up to 19 Hostilities-only battalions
- Garrison/HQ: Topsham Barracks, Exeter
- Nickname: The Bloody Eleventh
- Motto: Semper Fidelis (Ever faithful)
- Colors: Lincoln green facings
- March: We've Lived and We've Loved Together

Insignia
- Arm Badge: Croix de Guerre

The Devonshire Regiment was a line infantry regiment of the British Army that served under various titles and served in many wars and conflicts from 1685 to 1958, such as the Second Boer War, the First World War and the Second World War. In 1958 the regiment was amalgamated with the Dorset Regiment to form the Devonshire and Dorset Regiment which, in 2007, was amalgamated with the Royal Gloucestershire, Berkshire and Wiltshire Regiment, the Royal Green Jackets and The Light Infantry to form a new large regiment, The Rifles.

== History ==
=== Formation ===
In June 1667 Henry Somerset, Marquess of Worcester, was granted a commission to raise a regiment of foot, The Marquess of Worcester's Regiment of Foot. The regiment remained in existence for only a few months and was disbanded in the same year. It was re-raised in January 1673 and again disbanded in 1674. In 1682, Henry Somerset was created Duke of Beaufort, and in 1685 he was again commissioned to raise a regiment, The Duke of Beaufort's Regiment of Foot, or Beaufort Musketeers, to defend Bristol against the Duke of Monmouth's rebellion.

=== Early years ===
c. 1742 engraving of a regimental private

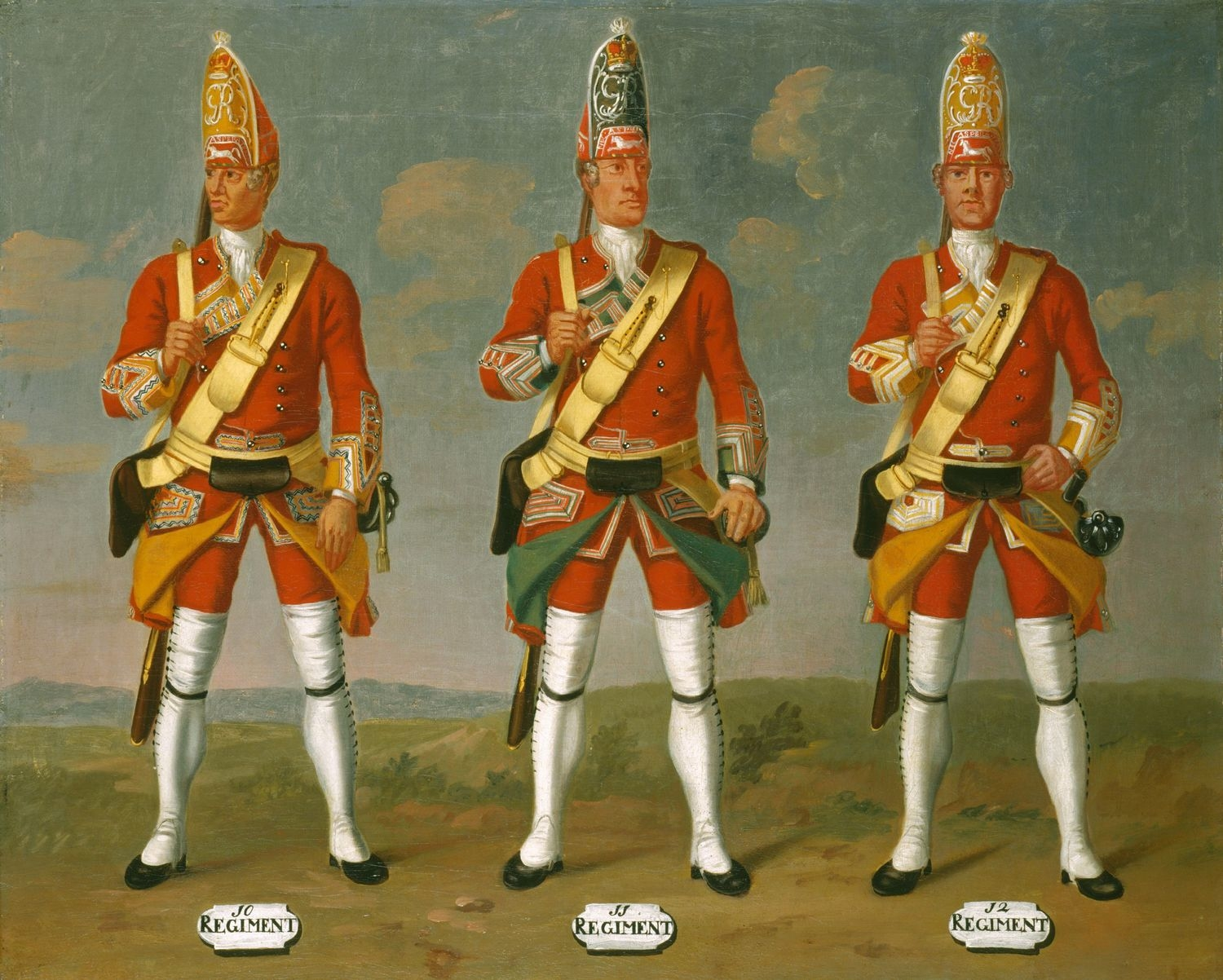
c. 1751 painting of a regimental grenadier (centre)

The regiment was not required to fight at the time of its formation since the Duke of Monmouth was drawn away from Bristol. Its first action came in Ireland at the Battle of the Boyne in July 1690 and the siege of Limerick in August 1691 when it fought for William III against the Irish Army of the deposed James II. It joined the armies of the Duke of Marlborough in Holland in the War of Spanish Succession in 1703, and also fought in the Iberian Campaign, being captured by the French at Portalegre in 1704 and part of the British army defeated at the Battle of Almansa in April 1707. Back in the United Kingdom, it helped put down the Jacobite rising of 1715, fighting the rebels at the inconclusive Battle of Sheriffmuir in November 1715 and at the Battle of Glen Shiel in June 1719.

The regiment was deployed to Flanders in summer 1742 for service in the War of Austrian Succession and took part in the Battle of Dettingen in June 1743, the Battle of Fontenoy in May 1745 and the Battle of Rocoux in October 1746.

The regiment embarked for the continent in spring 1760 for service in the Seven Years' War; it fought at the Battle of Warburg in July 1760, the Battle of Kloster Kampen in October 1760 and the Battle of Villinghausen in July 1761 as well as the Battle of Wilhelmsthal in June 1762 and the inconclusive Iberian campaign. After the war, it garrisoned the island of Menorca.

The regiment served under the name of its various Colonels until it was numbered as the 11th Regiment of Foot when the numerical system of regimental designation was adopted in 1751. It was given the additional county title of 11th (North Devonshire) Regiment of Foot in 1782.

=== French and Napoleonic Wars ===
The 11th Regiment spent the early years of the French Revolutionary Wars serving as detachments in the Mediterranean with the Royal Navy. It also took part in an abortive raid on the port of Ostend in 1798. It was deployed to the West Indies in 1801 where it captured Saint Barthélemy and Saint Martin later that year. A 2nd Battalion was formed in 1809 and took part in the disastrous Walcheren Campaign.

The 1st battalion returned to Europe in July 1809 to fight in the Peninsular War. It took part in the Battle of Bussaco in September 1810 and then fell back to the Lines of Torres Vedras. It took part in the siege of Badajoz in April 1811, the siege of Ciudad Rodrigo in January 1812 and earned its nickname, The Bloody Eleventh, at the Battle of Salamanca in July 1812. It fought at the siege of Burgos in September 1812 and then pursued the French Army into France taking part in the Battle of the Pyrenees in July 1813, the Battle of Nivelle in November 1813 and the Battle of the Nive in December 1813 as well as the Battle of Orthez in February 1814 and the Battle of Toulouse in April 1814.

=== The Victoria era ===
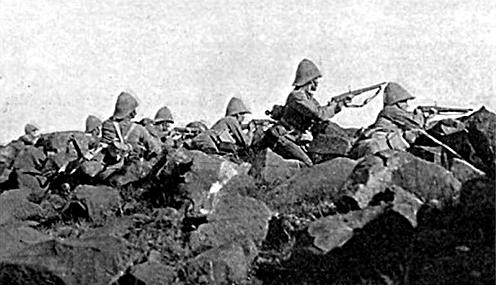
Soldiers of the Devonshire Regiment at the Relief of Ladysmith, 1900. They are facing Pepworth Hill, firing from behind boulders which provided for an effective cover.

The regiment spent most of the 19th century on garrison duty throughout the Empire. The regiment was not fundamentally affected by the Cardwell Reforms of the 1870s, which gave it a depot at Topsham Barracks in Exeter from 1873, or by the Childers reforms of 1881 – as it already possessed two battalions, there was no need for it to amalgamate with another regiment. (Note: The depot was the 34th Brigade Depot from 1873 to 1881, and the 11th Regimental District depot thereafter.) Under the reforms the regiment became the Devonshire Regiment on 1 July 1881. At the same time it merged with the militia and rifle volunteer units of the county of Devon. It took part in the Tirah Campaign in 1897 and the Second Boer War in 1899. The 1st Battalion were besieged at Ladysmith. It departed for India on 3 January 1902. The 2nd Battalion fought in the Second Anglo-Afghan War, the Anglo-Ashanti wars and the Second Boer War.

In 1908, the Volunteers and Militia were reorganised nationally, with the former becoming the Territorial Force and the latter the Special Reserve; the regiment now had one Reserve and four Territorial battalions. (Note: These were the 3rd Battalion (Special Reserve), with the 4th Battalion at Bedford Circus, Exeter (since demolished), the 5th (Prince of Wales's) Battalion at Prospect Place in Plymouth (since demolished), the 6th Battalion at The Strand in Barnstaple (since demolished) and the 7th (Cyclist) Battalion at Leighton Terrace in Exeter (since demolished) (all Territorial Force).)

=== First World War ===
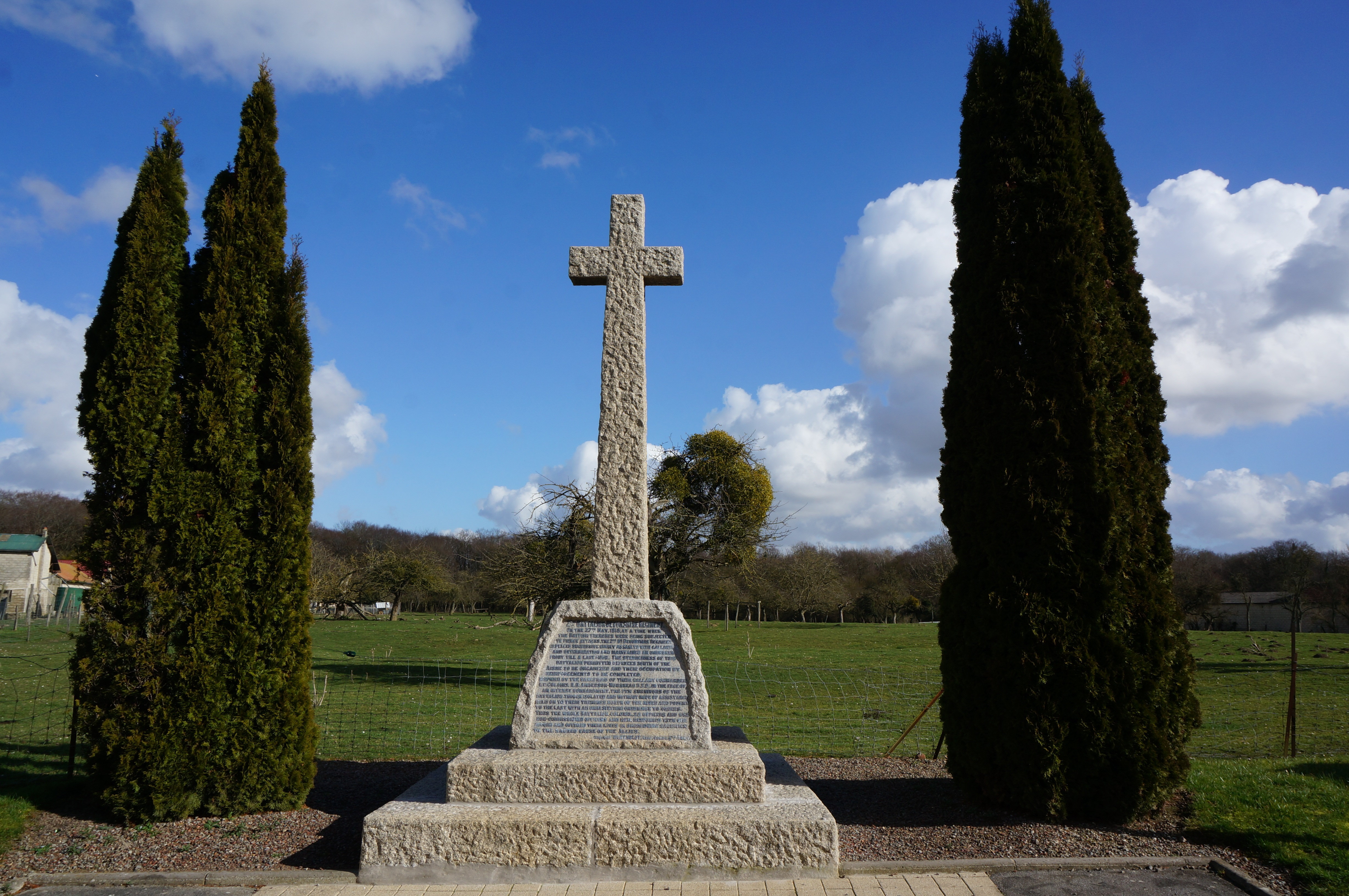
Memorial at La Ville-aux-Bois-lès-Pontavert.

==== Regular Army ====
The 1st Battalion, Devonshire Regiment was a Regular Army unit and, after absorbing some 500 reservists, departed for France, landing at Le Havre on 21 August 1914, just 17 days since Britain's entry into the war, as part of the British Expeditionary Force (BEF). The battalion joined the 8th Brigade of the 3rd Division in early September 1914, and then transferred to the 14th Brigade of the 5th Division later in the month. The battalion served on the Western Front throughout the war, seeing action first during the Battle of La Bassée in October where they helped in the capture of Givenchy Ridge, followed by the First Battle of Ypres, where the battalion, in common with most of the rest of the British Regular Army, sustained very heavy casualties. The 1st Devons lost in the battle two thirds of their officers and a third of the other ranks. The battalion then took part in the Winter operations 1914–1915, occupying trenches in deep mud and snow before, in April 1915, suffering 200 casualties from shelling and German counterattacks after holding Hill 60 after its capture a few days before.

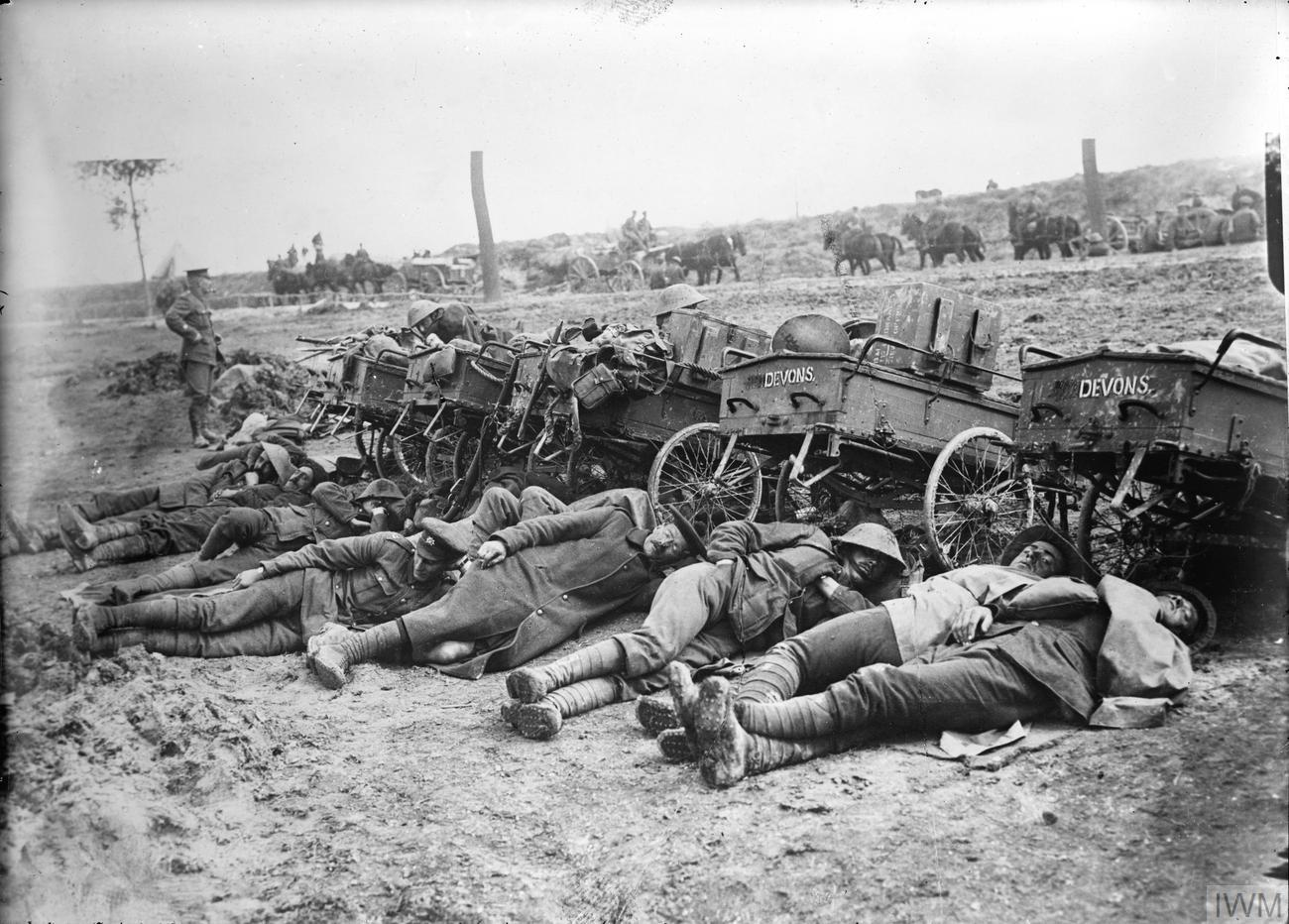
Lewis gun section of the 8th (Service) Battalion, Devonshire Regiment resting after an attack near Fricourt, France, August 1916.

The 2nd Battalion, assigned to the 23rd Brigade, 8th Division, was another Regular Army unit, that was awarded the French Croix de Guerre for holding up the massive final German advance of the war at the Bois des Buttes on 27 May 1918, the first day of the Third Battle of the Aisne. General Henri Berthelot, General Office Commanding the French 5th Army in his Order of the Day of 20 August 1918 said: "Thus the whole battalion, colonel, 28 officers and 552 non-commissioned officers and men, responded with one accord and offered their lives in ungrudging sacrifice to the sacred cause of the Allies."

The 3rd (Special Reserve) Battalion (formerly part of the Militia) was mobilised upon the outbreak of war to serve mainly in a training capacity, holding and training officers and men before sending them overseas to active battalions of the regiment throughout the world. By the end of the war over 13,000 men and 750 officers had passed through the battalion.

==== Territorial Force ====
The 1/4th, 1/5th (Prince of Wales's) and 1/6th Battalions of the Devonshire Regiment, all First Line Territorial Force (TF) units, were mobilised upon the outbreak of war, serving together in the Devon and Cornwall Brigade of the Wessex Division, and were sent to India. The 1/4th and 1/6th Battalions later saw action in Mesopotamia, while the 1/5th was transferred to the Western Front. The Second Line battalions (2/4th, 2/5th (Prince of Wales's) and 2/6th) also went to India, with the 2/4th and 2/5th later serving in Palestine and Mesopotamia respectively. The 1/7th and 2/7th (Cyclist) Battalions served in Home Defence.

==== Kitchener's Army ====
The 9th (Service) Battalion (Note: The Service designation indicates that this was a battalion of Lord Kitchener's New Army.) was one of the few British units to reach its initial objectives on the first day of the Battle of the Somme, albeit at the cost of 463 dead or wounded of the 775 men who went 'over the top', with only one officer remaining unwounded. The 8th (Service) Battalion, part of 20th Brigade reserve, was committed within 3 hours of the beginning of the attack and suffered 639 casualties on the first day. The 8th Battalion later served on the Italian Front. The 10th (Service) Battalion served at Salonika. The regiment also raised the 11th (Reserve), 12th (Labour), 13th (Works) and 14th (Labour) Battalions.

==== The later years of the war ====
The experience of an 18-year-old volunteer joining the 35th Training Reserve Battalion, part of the Devon Regiment, in 1918, is provided by A S Bullock.

=== Second World War ===
The 1st Battalion was serving in British India when the Second World War broke out, and spent the entire war in India, Ceylon and Burma. In 1942 the battalion joined the 80th Indian Infantry Brigade, attached to the 20th Indian Infantry Division and served with them until 1945 when the battalion was transferred to the British 26th Infantry Brigade. The brigade was part of the British 36th Infantry Division.

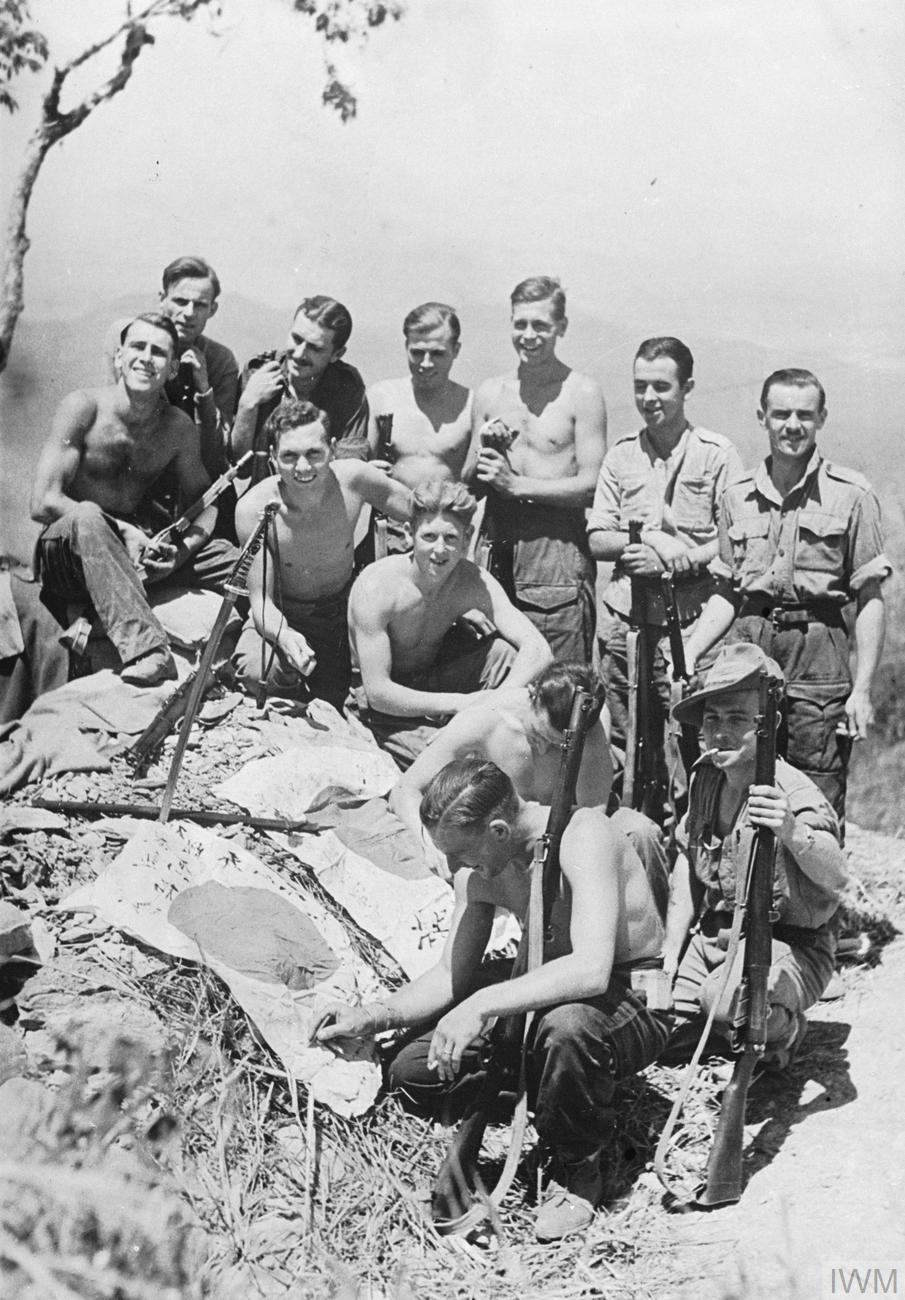
Men of the 1st Battalion, Devonshire Regiment sign their autographs on Japanese flags captured at Nippon Ridge during the Battle of Imphal-Kohima, March–July 1944.

The 2nd Battalion, Devonshire Regiment was a Regular Army unit that was serving on the island of Malta as part of the 1st Malta Infantry Brigade (redesignated as the 231st Infantry Brigade in April 1943) and was involved in the siege of Malta from June 1940 until November 1942. In July 1943 the battalion, together with the 231st Brigade, fought in the Allied invasion of Sicily, and, briefly, in the Allied invasion of Italy in September. After Italy the brigade was withdrawn to Sicily and then the United Kingdom where it became permanently part of the veteran 50th (Northumbrian) Infantry Division and trained with them in preparation for the Allied invasion of Normandy. On D-Day, 6 June 1944, it was intended that the battalion, commanded by Lieutenant Colonel Cosmo Nevill, should land at Le Hamel, on Gold Beach, behind the 1st Hampshires. However, owing to adverse sea conditions and an unexpectedly high tidal surge, three of the four rifle companies were carried over a mile to the east before they could make landfall and had to make their way to their assigned assembly point on foot. Of the four company commanders, two were wounded and one was killed. The battalion continued to fight well throughout the Battle of Normandy and the liberation of North-West Europe. However, in December 1944, the 50th Division was disbanded, due to a severe shortage of infantrymen in the British Army at the time, and the battalion was transferred to the 131st (Lorried) Infantry Brigade, part of the 7th Armoured Division, The Desert Rats, and remained with them for the rest of the war, participating in Operation Blackcock in January 1945 followed by Operation Plunder where they crossed the River Rhine. The division advanced on its destination of the city of Hamburg, Germany, as part of the Western Allied invasion of Germany, taking part in the Battle of Hamburg in late April 1945.

The Devonshire Regiment raised the 7th, 8th and 9th Territorial Army battalions, in addition to the 4th, 5th and 6th, all of which (except the 5th, which was converted pre-war into 86th Anti-Tank Regiment, Royal Artillery) were serving in the 45th (Wessex) Infantry Division on the outbreak of war. However, none of these units, save the 4th Battalion, saw active service outside of the United Kingdom and were used mainly for home defence, training or supplying the other battalions of the regiment with infantry replacements and served with many different brigades and divisions such as the 80th Infantry (Reserve) Division. The 4th Battalion was sent, in May 1940, to Gibraltar to join the 2nd Gibraltar Brigade and returned to the United Kingdom on 28 December 1943 and eventually joined the 164th Brigade, 55th (West Lancashire) Infantry Division before finally ending the war in the 183rd Infantry Brigade, 61st Infantry Division. The 6th Battalion was transferred to the 141st Brigade, 47th Division.

The 5th and 7th Battalions were converted to anti-tank units, becoming 86th, and 87th Anti-Tank Regiments, Royal Artillery respectively. The 86th Anti-Tank Regiment was a corps-level Anti-tank unit with XII Corps in the North West Europe Campaign, while the 87th Anti-Tank Regiment was active in North Africa with the British 1st Army before being disbanded in 1944.

The 50th (Holding) Battalion was raised in 1940 and renumbered the 12th Battalion the same year and spent most of its time on home defence anticipating a German invasion. In June 1943, due to the huge expansion of the British Army's airborne forces, the battalion was transferred to the 6th Airlanding Brigade, part of the 6th Airborne Division, and were converted into glider infantry, trained to enter battle by glider. The battalion landed in Normandy in the late afternoon of 6 June 1944 in Operation Mallard. The battalion also fought in the Battle of Breville, and served throughout the Battle of Normandy but as normal infantrymen. The battalion remained in Normandy until August 1944 where it participated in the breakout from the beachhead. The battalion, along the rest of 6th Airborne, was withdrawn to England in early September where they received new replacements, equipment and continued training. In December 1944 they fought briefly in the Battle of the Bulge but the outcome was already decided before the division arrived. The battalion crossed the River Rhine in Operation Varsity in March 1945 alongside the U.S. 17th Airborne Division. The battalion ended the war by the River Elbe. Throughout its time in 6th Airlanding Brigade, the battalion was allegedly nicknamed the Swedebashers by the men in the other battalions (1st RUR and 2nd OBLI), due to the battalion being commanded by a regular army officer but nearly all the officers and men of the 12th Devons had enlisted for hostilities-only.

=== Post-war and amalgamation ===
The 2nd Battalion was disbanded at Topsham Barracks in Exeter in 1948. The remaining battalion was in Malaya from 1948 to 1951 at the time of the Malayan Emergency and in Kenya from 1953 to 1955, during the Mau Mau Uprising. In 1958, the regiment was amalgamated with the Dorset Regiment to form the Devonshire and Dorset Regiment.

== Regimental museum ==
The regimental collection is displayed in the Keep Military Museum in Dorchester.

== Battle honours ==
The regiment was awarded the following battle honours:

- Dettingen, Salamanca, Pyrenees, Nivelle, Nive, Orthes, Toulouse, Peninsula, Afghanistan 1879–80, Tirah, Defence of Ladysmith, Relief of Ladysmith, South Africa 1899–1902
- The Great War (25 battalions): Aisne 1914 '18, La Bassée 1914, Armentières 1914, Neuve Chapelle, Hill 60, Ypres 1915 '17, Gravenstafel, St. Julien, Frezenberg, Aubers, Loos, Somme 1916 '18, Albert 1916, Bazentin, Delville Wood, Guillemont, Flers-Courcelette, Morval, Arras 1917 '18, Vimy 1917, Scarpe 1917, Bullecourt, Pilckem, Langemarck 1917, Polygon Wood, Broodseinde, Poelcappelle, Passchendaele, Rosières, Villers Bretonneux, Lys, Hazebrouck, Bois des Buttes, Marne 1918, Tardenois, Bapaume 1918, Hindenburg Line, Havrincourt, Épéhy, Canal du Nord, Beaurevoir, Cambrai 1918, Selle, Sambre, France and Flanders 1914–18, Piave, Vittorio Veneto, Italy 1917–18, Doiran 1917 '18, Macedonia 1915–18, Egypt 1916–17, Gaza, Nebi Samwil, Jerusalem, Tel Asur, Palestine 1917–18, Tigris 1916, Kut al Amara 1917, Mesopotamia 1916–18
- The Second World War: Normandy Landing, Port en Bessin, Tilly sur Seulles, Caen, St. Pierre la Vielle, Nederrijn, Roer, Rhine, Ibbenburen, North-West Europe 1944–45, Landing in Sicily, Regalbuto, Sicily 1943, Landing at Porto San Venere, Italy 1943, Malta 1940–42, Imphal, Shenam Pass, Tamu Road, Ukhrul, Myinmu Bridgehead, Kyaukse 1945, Burma 1943–45
- 4th, 5th, 6th Bns: South Africa 1900–01

== Colonels ==
Colonels of the Regiment were:

- 1667: Edward Somerset, 2nd Marquess of Worcester
- disbanded
- 1673: Col Henry Somerset, 1st Duke of Beaufort
- disbanded
- 1685: Col Henry Somerset, 1st Duke of Beaufort
- 1685–1687: Col Charles Somerset, Marquess of Worcester
- 1687–1688: Lt-Gen William Herbert, 2nd Marquess of Powis
- 1688–1702: Maj-Gen Sir John Hanmer, 3rd Baronet
- 1702–1705: Gen James Stanhope, 1st Earl Stanhope
- 1705–1715: Maj-Gen John Hill
- 1715–1738: Brig-Gen Edward Montagu
- 1738–1743: Maj-Gen Stephen Cornwallis
- 1743–1746: Col Robinson Sowle
- 1746–1747: Brig-Gen William Graham
- 1747–1765: Lt-Gen Maurice Bocland

=== The 11th Regiment of Foot ===
- 1765–1781: Gen William A'Court Ashe
- 1781–1791: Lt-Gen Francis Smith

=== The 11th (North Devonshire) Regiment ===
- 1791–1806: Gen James Grant
- 1806–1807: Gen Hon Richard FitzPatrick
- 1807–1823: Gen Sir Charles Asgill, 2nd Baronet GCH
- 1823–1837: Gen Sir Henry Tucker Montresor KCB GCH
- 1837–1841: Gen Sir Rufane Shaw Donkin KCB GCH
- 1841–1856: Gen Sir John Wilson KCB
- 1856–1857: Lt-Gen William George Cochrane
- 1857–1862: Lt-Gen Sir Richard Doherty
- 1862–1874: Gen Sir John Gaspard Le Marchant GCMG KCB

=== Devonshire Regiment ===
- 1874–1890: Gen Sir Francis Seymour, 1st Baronet GCB
- 1890–1897: Gen Sir George Harry Smith Willis GCB
- 1897–1902: Lt-Gen Sir Edward Newdigate Newdegate KCB
- 1902–1903: Maj-Gen Hon. Charles John Addington
- 1903–1910: Maj-Gen Hon. Sir Savage Lloyd Mostyn KCB (also Royal Welch Fusiliers)
- 1910–1921: Lt-Gen Sir George Mackworth Bullock KCB
- 1921–1930: Lt-Gen Sir Louis Jean Bols KCB KCMG DSO
- 1930–1943: Maj-Gen Sir Charles Clarkson Martin Maynard KCB CMG DSO
- 1943–1948: Col Harold Street DSO
- 1948–1958: Col Lionel Henry Mountifort Westropp

== Victoria Crosses ==
The following members of the regiment were awarded the Victoria Cross:

- Lieutenant (later Major) James Edward Ignatius Masterson, Second Boer War
- Private (later Corporal) Theodore Veale, Great War
- Lance-Corporal (later Captain) George Onions, Great War
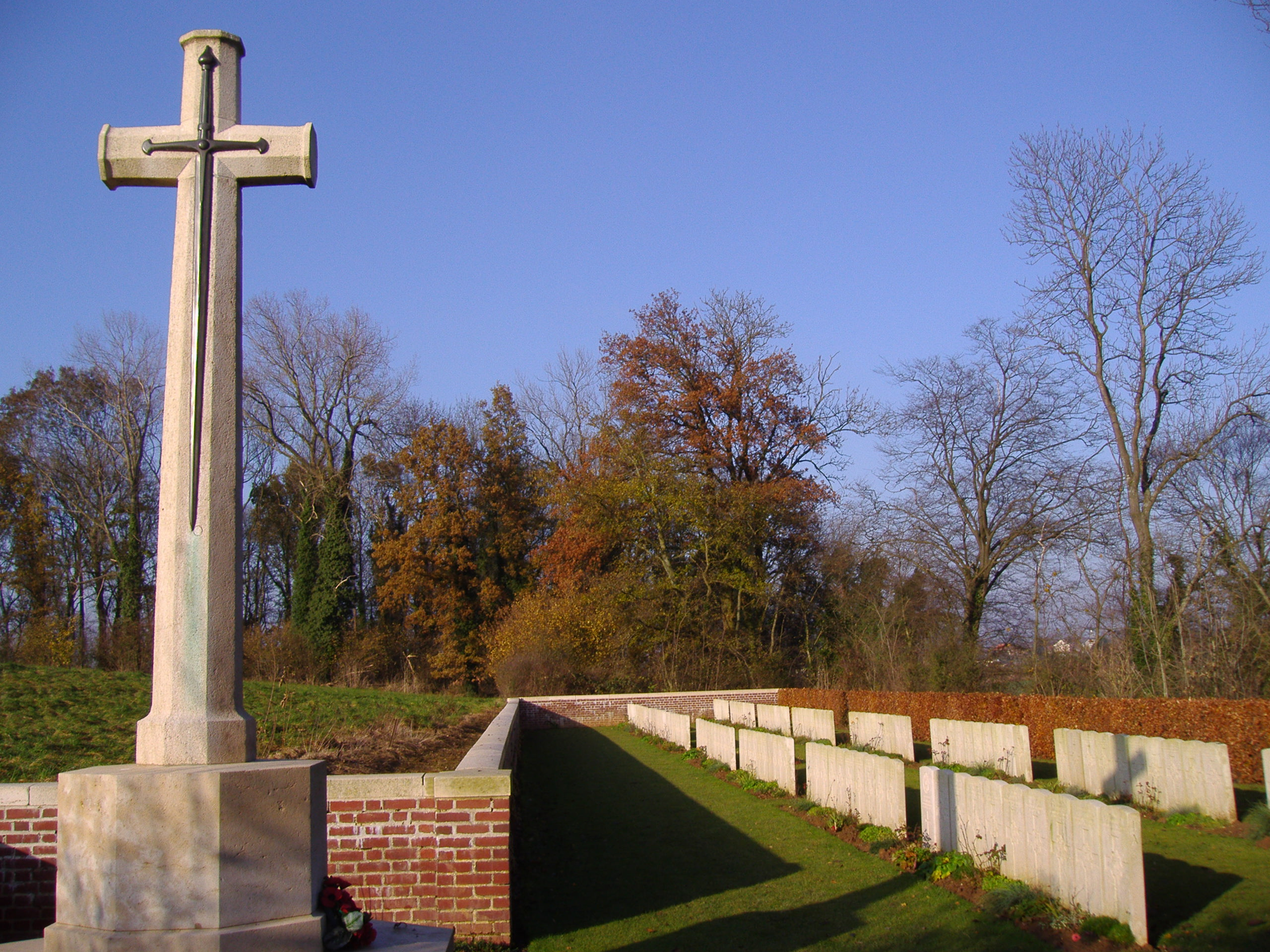
The Devonshire cemetery at Mansell Copse, Mametz, Northern France, location of the famous sign left after the battle: 'The Devonshires held this trench; the Devonshires hold it still'

== Sources ==
- Cannon, Richard (1845). "Historical Record of the Eleventh Regiment, Or the North Devon Regiment of Foot: Containing an Account of the Formation of the Regiment in 1685, and of Its Subsequent Services to 1845". Parker, Furnivall and Parker.*
