= Godfrey Milton-Thompson =

Royal Navy Surgeon Vice Admiral (1930-2012)

Surgeon Vice Admiral Sir Godfrey Milton-Thompson KBE KStJ FRCP
- Born: 25 April 1930; Cheshire
- Died: 23 September 2012 (aged 82); Cornwall
- Military career
- Allegiance: United Kingdom
- Branch: Royal Navy
- Service years: 1955–95
- Rank: Surgeon Vice Admiral
- Unit: Royal Navy Medical Service
- Commands: SG (1985-90)
- Awards: KBE (1988); KStJ (1989)
- Other work: St John Hospitaller

Surgeon Vice Admiral Sir Godfrey James Milton-Thompson KBE KStJ FRCP (25 April 1930 – 23 September 2012) was a senior Royal Navy officer. From 1988 to 1990, he was Surgeon-General, senior medical officer of the British Armed Forces.

== Early life ==
Milton-Thompson was the younger son of the Revd James Milton-Thompson, a Church of England priest on the Wirral, Cheshire. He was educated at Eastbourne College before going to read Medicine at Queens' College, Cambridge (MA) and further medical study at St Thomas' Hospital (MB, BChir). He was elected a Fellow of the Royal College of Physicians in 1974.

== Military service ==
Milton-Thompson joined the Royal Navy in 1955, in which he saw 35 years active service. He was Surgeon General in the Ministry of Defence from 1988 to 1990. He was a Queen's Honorary Physician (QHP) from 1982 until 1990. From 1990 until 1995 he became Honorary Colonel of 211th (Wessex) Field Hospital Royal Army Medical Corps.

== Later life ==
Milton-Thompson served as Hospitaller of the Most Venerable Order of St John of Jerusalem and Chairman of the St John Fellowship.

== Personal life ==
Milton-Thompson married Noreen Fitzmaurice, the daughter of Sir Desmond Fitzmaurice CIE, in 1952. They had three daughters.
