= 243 (Wessex) Multi-Role Medical Regiment =

243 (The Wessex) Field Hospital 243rd (Wessex) Multi-Role Medical Regiment
- Active: 1996 – Present
- Country: United Kingdom
- Branch: British Army
- Role: Medical
- Size: Regiment; 203 personnel
- Part of: 2nd Medical Brigade
- Garrison/HQ: Keynsham

243rd (Wessex) Multi-Role Medical Regiment is a unit of the Royal Army Medical Service within the Army Reserve of the British Army.

== History ==
The unit was formed in 1999, through the amalgamation of 211th (Wessex) Field Hospital, and 219th (Wessex) Field Hospital, as 243 (The Wessex) Field Hospital. As a result of Army 2020, the hospital was under 2nd Medical Brigade, and was paired with the now disbanded 33 Field Hospital.

Under the Future Soldier programme, the regiment was redesignated as the 243rd (Wessex) Multi-Role Medical Regiment and remains under 2nd Medical Group.

== Current Structure ==
The regiment's current structure is as follows:

- Headquarters, at Keynsham
- 128 Support Squadron, at Keynsham and Gloucester
- 219 Hospital Squadron, at Wyvern Barracks, Exeter
- 211 Hospital Squadron, at Plymouth and Truro
- 129 Medical Squadron, at Portsmouth

== Uniform ==
The Wessex Wyvern Division Sign was used by the 43rd (Wessex) Infantry Division during the two world wars: a mythical creature said to lurk in the West Country. The sign was re-introduced to the Army in mid-1993 with the 211th Field Hospital becoming the first unit to re-use the symbol on their combat jackets. The sign was publicly worn for the first time on 24 October 1993 at the 75th Anniversary commemorations of the awards of the Croix de Guerre to the 24th Field Ambulance.

The use of the Croix-de-Guerre is granted for the 243rd (Wessex) Multi-Role Medical Regiment, though it is no longer worn on battle dress or in the field following the adoption of the new Multi-Terrain Pattern in 2010.

== See also ==
- Official History of 243rd (Wessex) Field Hospital and its predecessors in the First World War on YouTube
- 211th/219th/243rd Wessex Field Hospital Members Facebook Group
