= La Ville-aux-Bois-lès-Pontavert =

- Commune
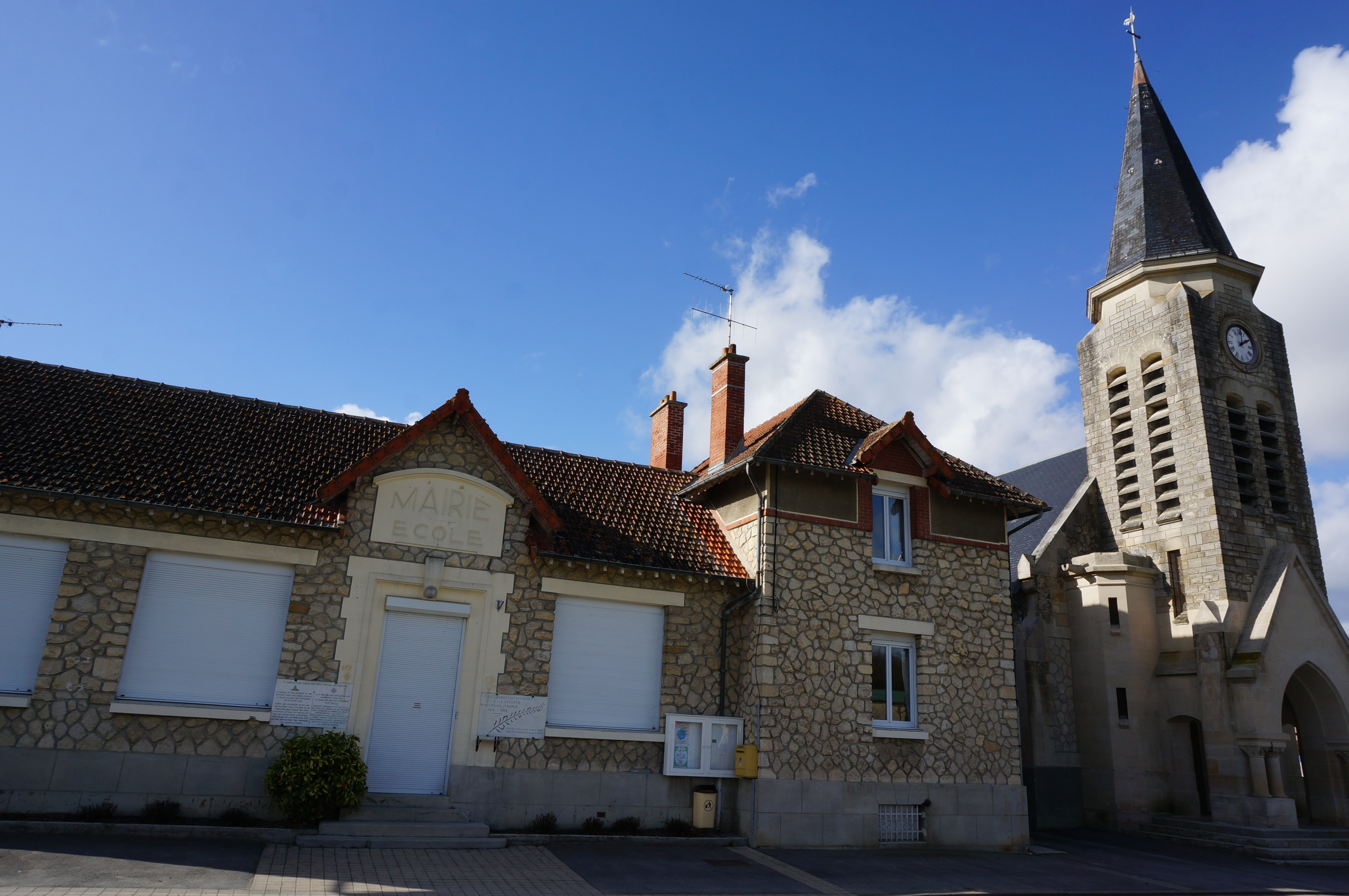
- The town hall and church of La Ville-aux-Bois-lès-Pontavert
- Location of La Ville-aux-Bois-lès-Pontavert
- Location within France Location within Hauts-de-France
- Coordinates: 49°25′43″N 3°51′02″E
- Country: France
- Region: Hauts-de-France
- Department: Aisne
- Arrondissement: Laon
- Canton: Villeneuve-sur-Aisne
- Intercommunality: Champagne Picarde

Government
  - Mayor (2026–32): Dominique Duwicquet
- Area^{1}: 8.32 km^{2} (3.21 sq mi)
- Elevation: 79 m (259 ft)
- Highest elevation: 98 m (322 ft)
- Lowest elevation: 52 m (171 ft)
- Population (2023): 150
  - Density: 18/km^{2} (47/sq mi)
- Time zone: UTC+01:00 (CET)
  - Summer (DST): UTC+02:00 (CEST)
- INSEE/Postal code: 02803 /02160
- ^{1} French Land Register data, which excludes lakes, ponds, glaciers > 1 km^{2} (0.386 sq mi or 247 acres) and river estuaries.

La Ville-aux-Bois-lès-Pontavert (French pronunciation: [la vil o bwa lɛ pɔ̃tavɛʁ], literally La Ville-aux-Bois near Pontavert) is a commune in the Aisne department in Hauts-de-France in northern France.

== Population ==
Historical population
Year	Pop.	±% p.a.
1968	129	—
1975	96	−4.13%
1982	119	+3.12%
1990	109	−1.09%
1999	136	+2.49%
2007	119	−1.66%
2012	131	+1.94%
2017	143	+1.77%
2023	150	+0.80%
Source: INSEE

== See also ==
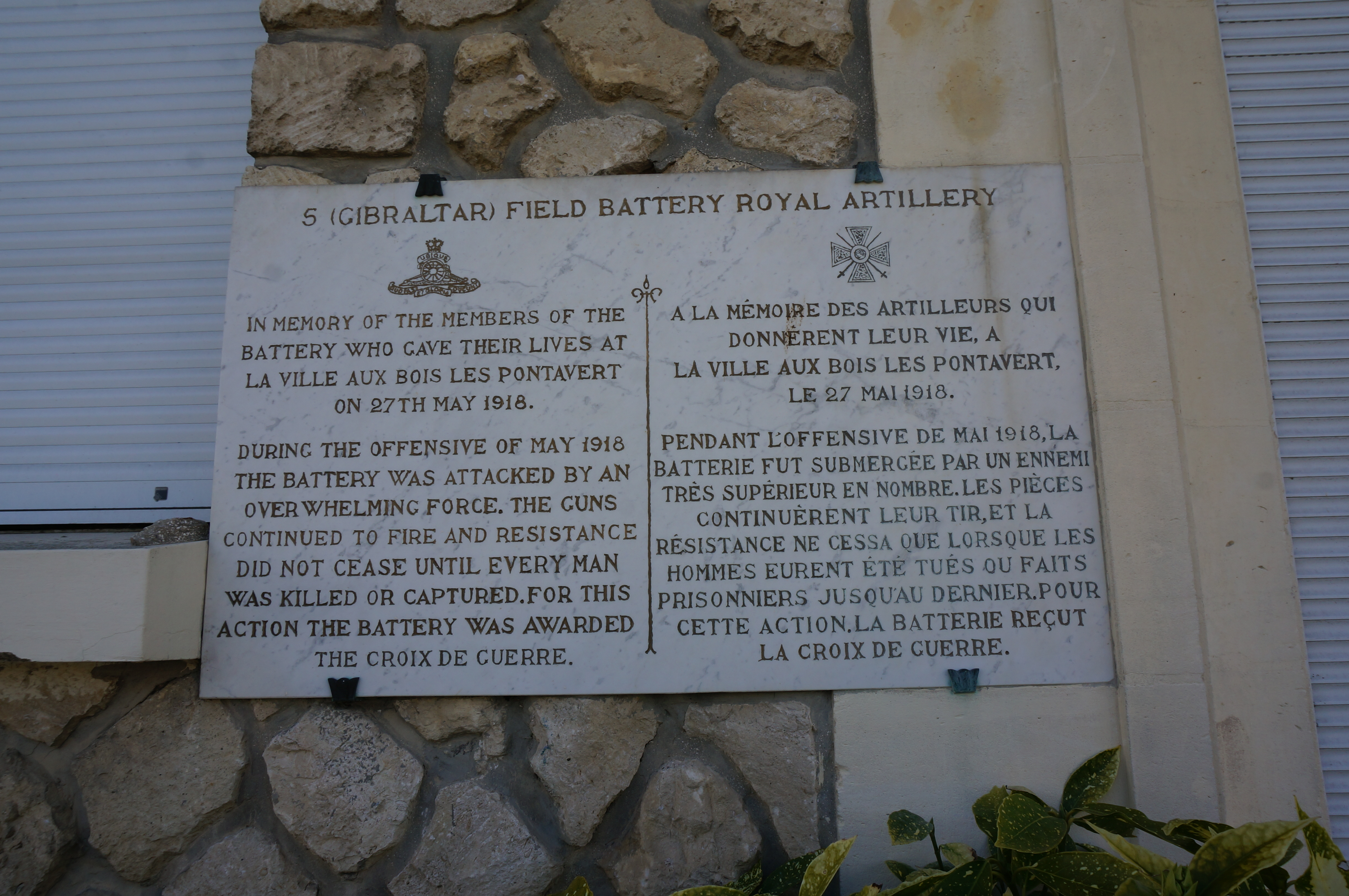
Memorial, 5ht field battery.

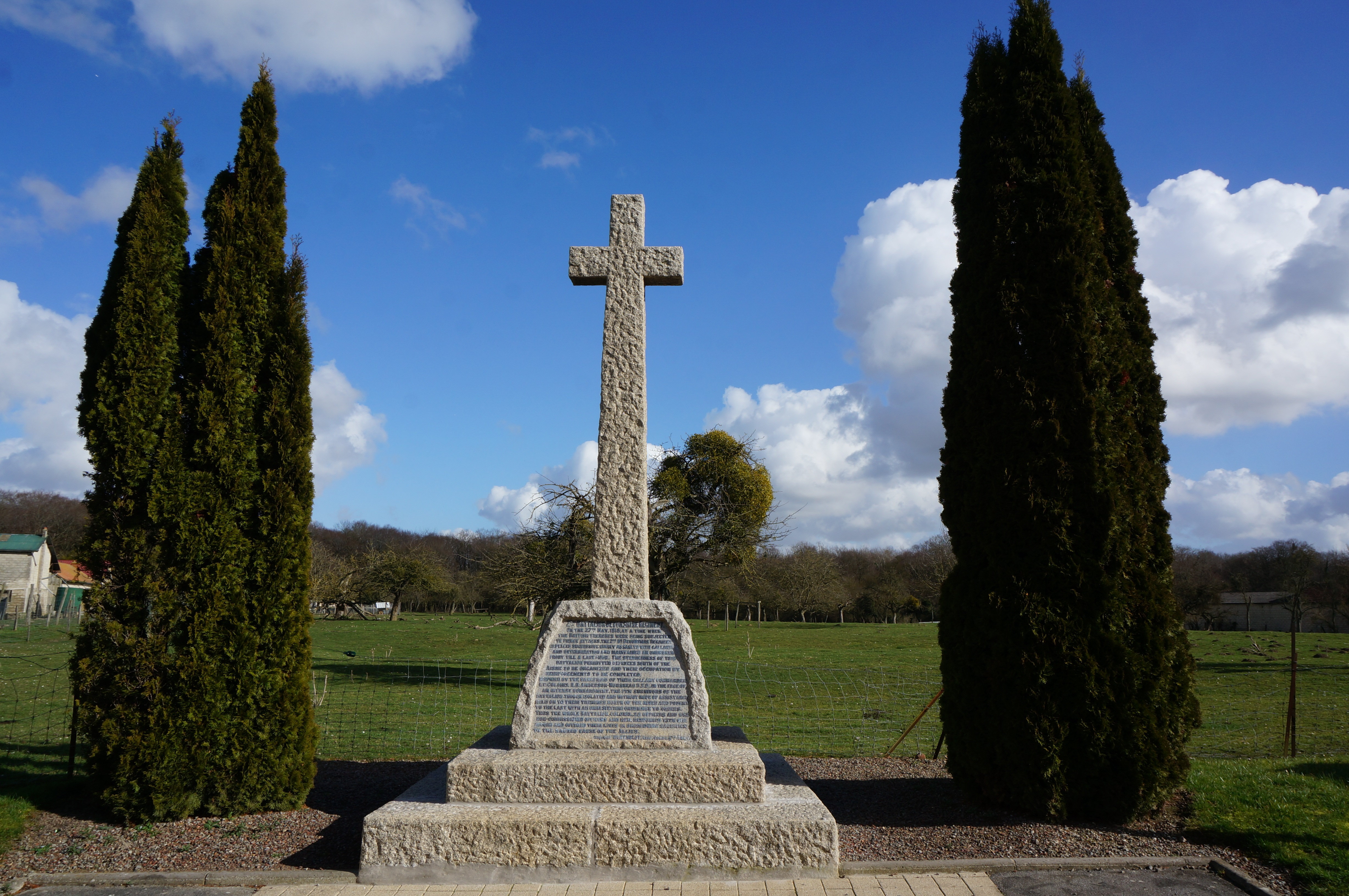
Memorial, Devonshire Regiment.

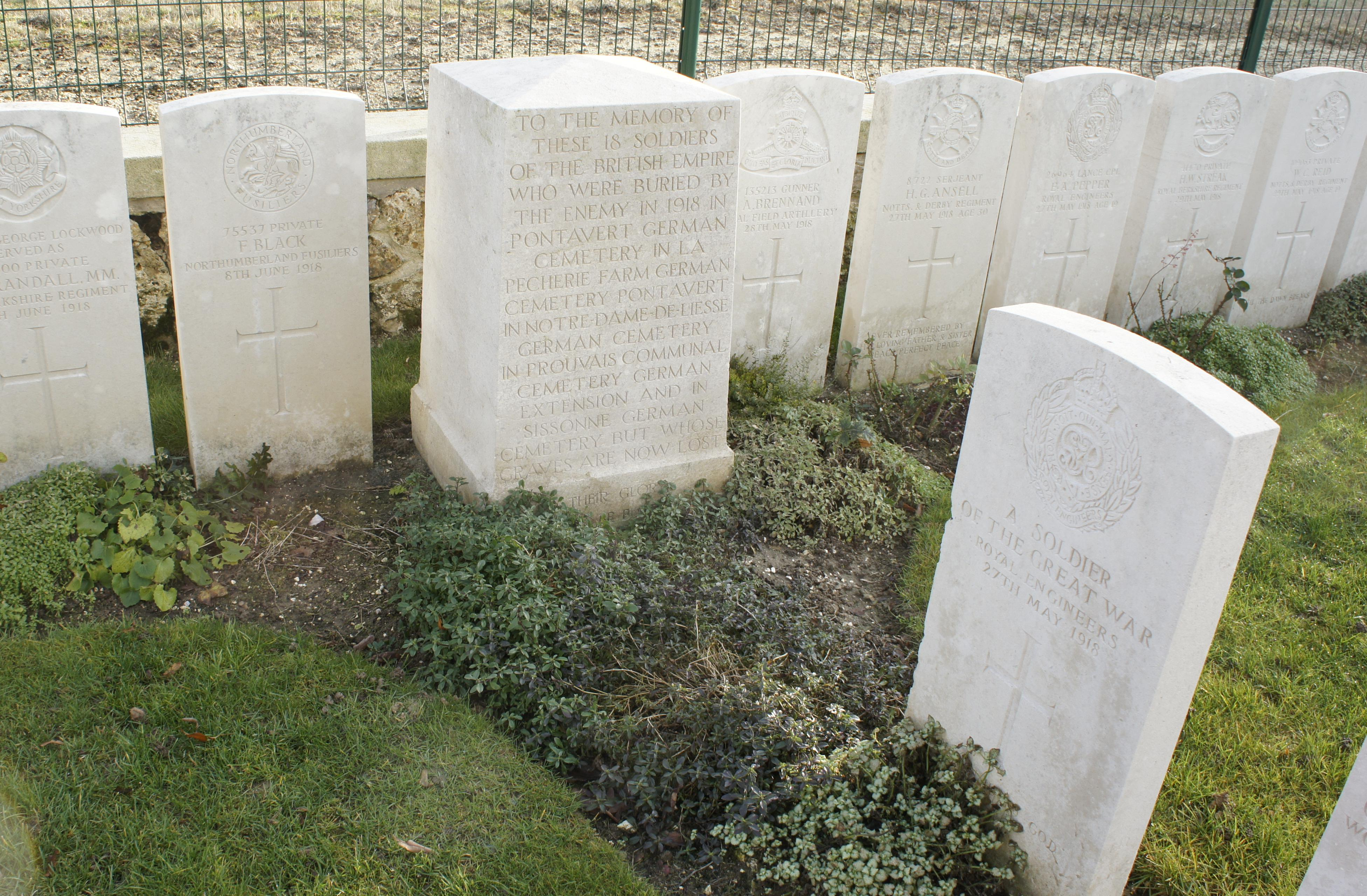
British cemetery.
- Communes of the Aisne department
