= Wyvern Barracks =

Barracks in Exeter, Devon, England

- Exeter
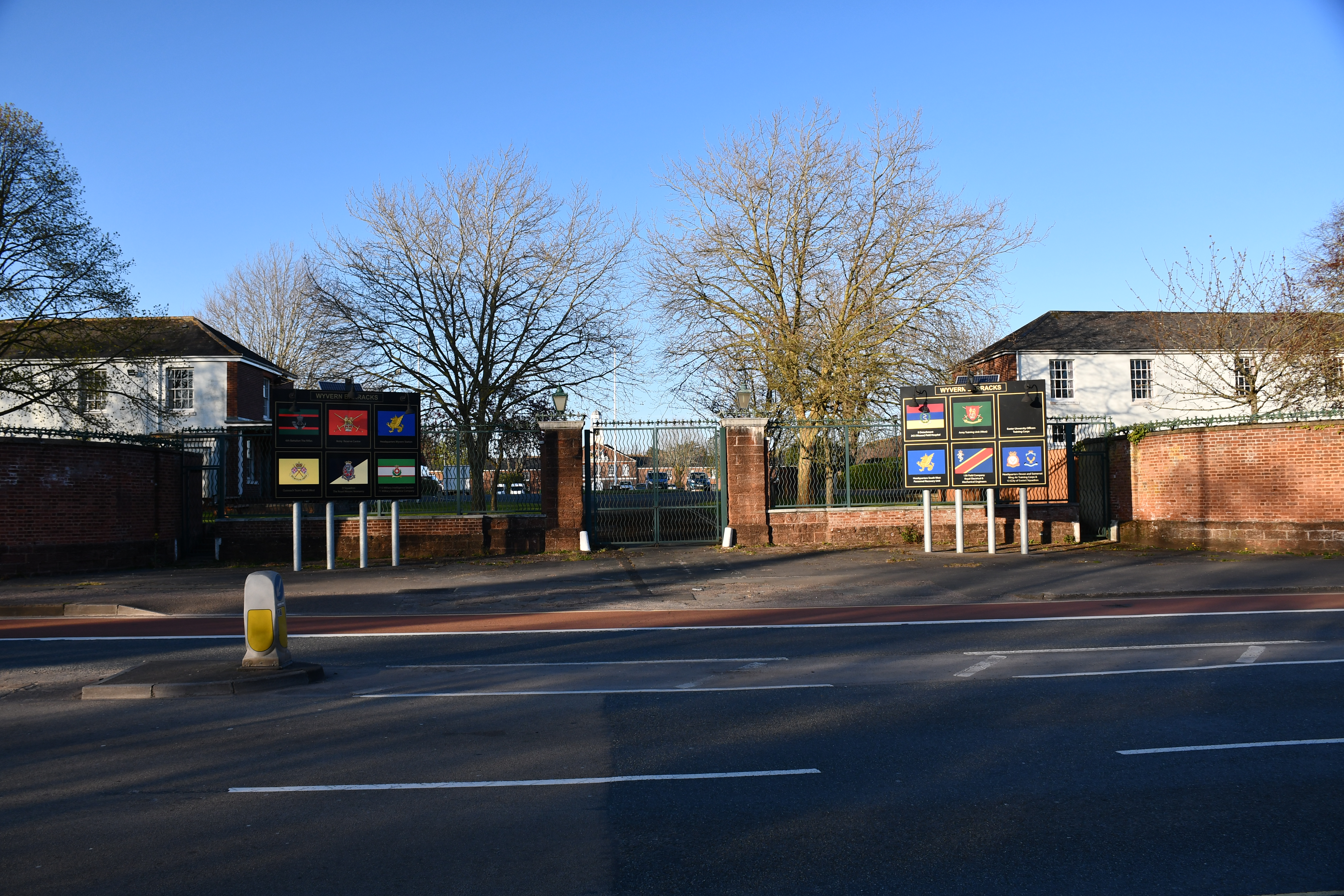
- Entrance to Wyvern Barracks

Site information
- Type: Barracks
- Owner: Ministry of Defence
- Operator: British Army

Location
- Location within Devon
- Coordinates: 50°42′41″N 03°30′41″W

Site history
- Built: 1800
- Built for: War Office
- In use: 1800-Present

Garrison information
- Occupants: 6th Battalion, The Rifles

Wyvern Barracks is a military installation on Topsham Road in Exeter.

== History ==
The site was established as an artillery barracks for the Board of Ordnance under the name of Topsham Barracks around 1800. In 1873 a system of recruiting areas based on counties was instituted under the Cardwell Reforms and the barracks became the depot for the two battalions of the 11th (North Devonshire) Regiment of Foot. Following the Childers Reforms, the regiment evolved to become the Devonshire Regiment with its depot in the barracks in 1881.

During the First World War a reserve brigade of the Royal Field Artillery was based there and during the Second World War units of the United States Army were based there. After becoming home to the Devonshire and Dorset Regiment in 1958, the barracks went on to become the regional centre for infantry training as the Wessex Brigade Depot under the name of Wyvern Barracks in 1960.

== Current units ==
It is currently home to:

- Battalion HQ, HQ Company and an Assault Pioneer Platoon of 6th Battalion, The Rifles
- Exeter University Officers' Training Corps
- B Detachment of 243 Multi-Role Medical Regiment
- 715 Military Intelligence Section of 71 Military Intelligence Company of 7 Military Intelligence Battalion.
