= Korean War Ranger Companies =

The Korean War Ranger Companies were the United States Army Rangers of the Korean War.

== History ==
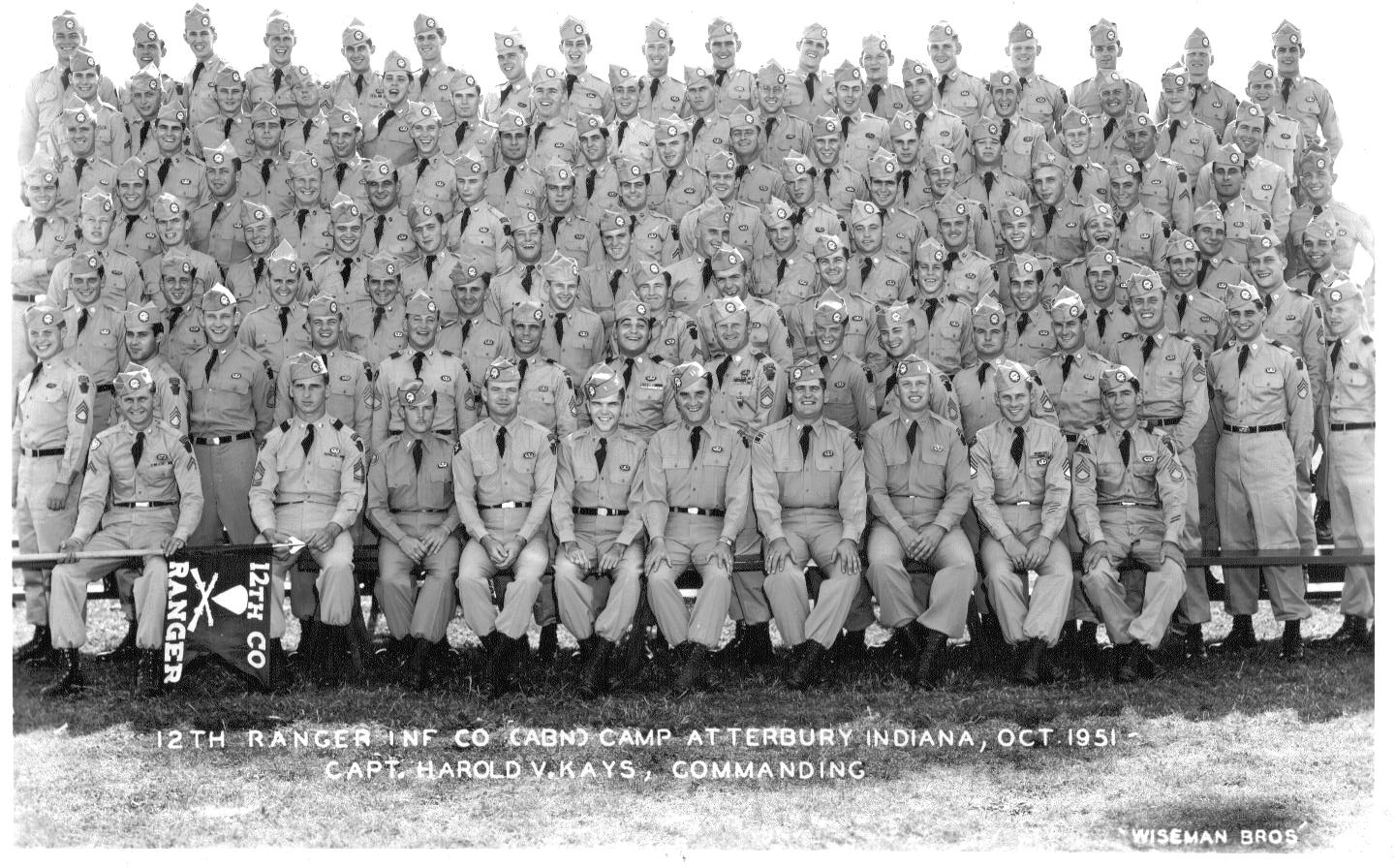
The 12th Ranger Infantry Company graduates from training in 1951.

At the outbreak of war in Korea, a unique Ranger unit was formed. Headed by Second Lieutenant Ralph Puckett, the Eighth Army Ranger Company was created in August 1950. It would serve as the role model for the rest of the Ranger units to be formed. Instead of being organized into self-contained battalions, the Ranger units of the Korean and Vietnam eras would be organized into companies and then attached to larger units, to serve as organic special operations units.

In addition to the special skills and techniques used by their forebears, the Ranger Infantry Companies added airborne assault to their repertoire. All Rangers within the companies were airborne qualified.

In total, eighteen additional Ranger companies were formed in the next seven months: Eighth Army Raider Company and First through Fifteenth Ranger Infantry Companies (Airborne) and Ranger Infantry Companies A & B. The Army Chief of Staff assigned the Ranger training program at Fort Benning to Colonel John Gibson Van Houten. The program would eventually be split to include a training program located in Korea. 3rd and 7th Ranger companies were tasked to train new Rangers.

The 28 October 1950 would see the next four Ranger companies formed. Soldiers from the 505th Airborne Infantry Regiment and the 82nd Airborne's 80th Anti-Aircraft Artillery Battalion volunteered and, after initially being designated the 4th Ranger Company, became the 2nd Ranger Company — the only all-black Ranger unit in United States history. After the four companies had begun their training, they were joined by the 5th-8th Ranger companies on 20 November 1950.

During the course of the war, the Rangers patrolled and probed, scouted and destroyed, attacked and ambushed the Communist Chinese and Korean enemy. The 1st Rangers destroyed the 12th North Korean Division headquarters in a daring night raid. The 2nd and 4th Rangers made a combat airborne assault near Munsan where Life Magazine reported that Allied troops were now patrolling north of the 38th Parallel. Crucially, the 2nd Rangers plugged the gap made by the retreating Allied forces, the 5th Rangers helped stop the Chinese 5th Phase Offensive. To provide manning slots for newly activated Special Forces units, all Ranger companies were inactivated in 1951, beginning with the Eighth Army Ranger Company on 28 March and ending with 6th Ranger Company on 1 December.

== Organization ==
Ranger Companies of the Korean War
Company	Unit Attached	Date Activated	Date Inactivated
Eighth Army Ranger Company (8213 AU)	25th Infantry Division / IX US Army Corps	Aug, 25 1950	Mar, 28 1951
GHQ Raider Company (8227 AU) / X Corps Raider Company (8245 AU)	Special Activities Group / X US Army Corps	Nov, 12 1950	Apr, 1 1951
1st Ranger Company	2nd Infantry Division	Oct, 28 1950	Aug, 1 1951
2nd Ranger Company	7th Infantry Division / 187th ABN. RCT	Oct, 28 1950	Aug, 1 1951
3rd Ranger Company	Ranger Training Command / 3rd Infantry Division / I US Army Corps	Oct, 28 1950	Aug, 1 1951
4th Ranger Company	1st Cavalry Division / 187th ABN. RCT / 1st Marine Division	Oct, 28 1950	Aug, 1 1951
5th Ranger Company	25th Infantry Division / I US Army Corps	Nov, 20 1950	Aug, 1 1951
6th Ranger Company	Seventh US Army	Nov, 20 1950	Dec, 1 1951
7th Ranger Company	Ranger Training Command	Nov, 20 1950	Nov, 5 1951
8th Ranger Company	24th Infantry Division / IX US Army Corps	Nov, 20 1950	Aug, 1 1951
9th Ranger Company	Third US Army	Jan, 5 1951	Nov, 5 1951
10th Ranger Company	45th Infantry Division	Jan, 5 1951	Oct, 15 1951
11th Ranger Company	40th Infantry Division	Jan, 5 1951	Sept, 21 1951
12th Ranger Company	28th Division	Feb, 1 1951	Oct, 27 1951
13th Ranger Company	43rd Infantry Division (United States)	Feb, 1 1951	Oct, 15 1951
14th Ranger Company	4th Infantry Division	Feb, 27 1951	Oct, 27 1951
15th Ranger Company	Third US Army	Feb, 27 1951	Nov, 5 1951
Ranger Infantry Company Able "A"	Ranger Training Command		
Ranger Infantry Company Baker "B"	Ranger Training Command		
