= 3rd Ranger Infantry Company (United States) =

US Army unit in the Korean War

3rd Ranger Infantry Company (Airborne)
- Active: 25 October 1950 - 1 August 1951
- Country: United States of America
- Allegiance: United States Army
- Branch: Active duty
- Type: Ranger light infantry
- Role: Irregular warfare
- Size: Company
- Part of: Eighth United States Army
- Garrison/HQ: Pusan, South Korea
- Mottos: "Die Bastard, die!"
- Engagements: Korean War

Commanders
- Notable commanders: Jesse Tidwell

The 3rd Ranger Infantry Company (Airborne) was a Ranger light infantry company of the United States Army active during the Korean War. As a small special forces unit, it specialized in irregular warfare.

Four Airborne Ranger Companies were formed in the fall of 1950. They were trained and graduated on November 15. By the end of 1950, the 1st, 2nd, and 4th Companies had deployed early for combat in Korea. The 3rd Ranger Company had been drawn upon heavily to replace training losses of the deploying companies. It received 80 trainees and completed a second cycle of Ranger training at the Ranger Training Center at Fort Benning, Georgia. The company deployed to South Korea in March 1951 and was assigned to the U.S. 3rd Infantry Division for four months, where it was used as a reconnaissance and scouting unit, probing North Korean People's Volunteer Army positions. The company is known for its "Battle of Bloody Ridge" on 11 April where, on its first mission, it was able to push back the opposing force. The company later supported the 3rd Infantry Division at the Battle of the Imjin River.

Later in the summer, the company was used as a stealth "target acquisition" force, infiltrating Chinese positions and spotting concentrations of troops and equipment for artillery attack. The company was deactivated on 1 August 1951, and was merged with the U.S. 187th Airborne Regimental Combat Team alongside all other Ranger units.

== Origins ==
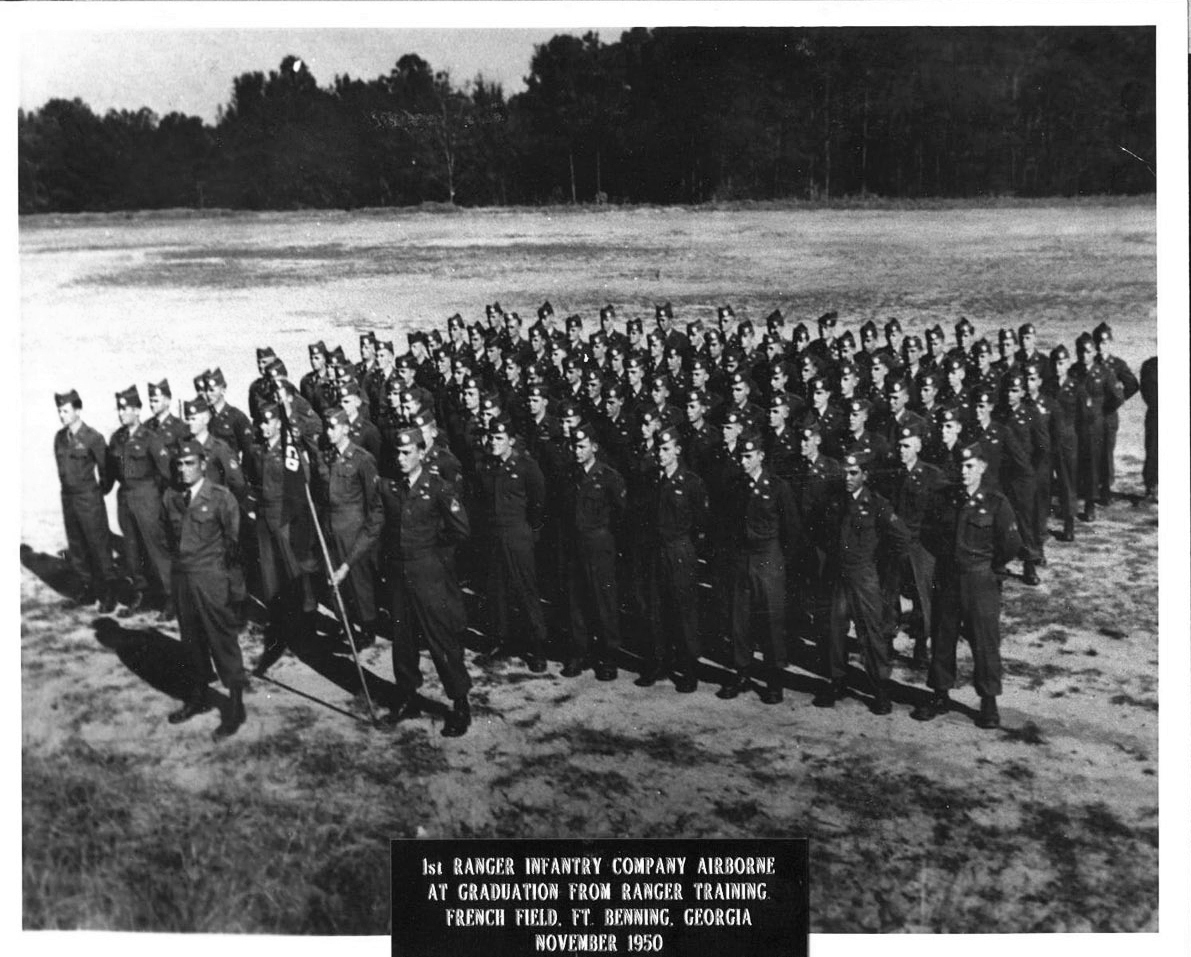
The 1st Ranger Company graduates from Ranger training in November 1950.

With the 25 June 1950 outbreak of the Korean War, the North Korean People's Army had invaded the Republic of Korea (ROK) with 90,000 well-trained and equipped troops who had easily overrun the smaller and more poorly equipped Republic of Korea Army. The United States (U.S.) and United Nations (UN) began an intervention campaign to prevent South Korea from collapsing. The U.S. troops engaged the North Koreans first at the Battle of Osan, being badly defeated on 5 July by the better-trained North Koreans. From then on, the U.S. and UN saw a steady stream of defeats until they had been pushed back to the tip of the peninsula, into a 140-mile (230 km)-long fortification dubbed Pusan Perimeter by August. At the same time, North Korean agents began to infiltrate behind UN lines and attack military targets and cities.

UN units, spread out along the Pusan Perimeter, were having a difficult time repelling these units as they were untrained in combating guerrilla warfare. North Korean special forces units such as the NK 766th Independent Infantry Regiment had defeated ROK troops and used irregular warfare tactics effectively, prompting Army Chief of Staff General J. Lawton Collins to order the creation of an elite force which could "infiltrate through enemy lines and attack command posts, artillery, tank parks, and key communications centers or facilities." All U.S. Army Ranger units had been disbanded after World War II because they required time-consuming training, specialization, and expensive equipment.

With the defeat of the NK 766th Regiment at the Battle of P'ohang-dong, and the strength of U.S. infantry units in question, U.S. commanders felt recreating Ranger units was essential. In early August, as the Battle of Pusan Perimeter was beginning, the Eighth United States Army, in command of all US forces in Korea, ordered Lieutenant Colonel John H. McGee, the head of its G-3 Operations miscellaneous division, to create a new experimental Army Ranger unit, the Eighth Army Ranger Company. In the meantime, the Ranger Training Center was established at Fort Benning, Georgia.

=== Organization ===
With the successful development of the Eighth Army Ranger Company as a "test" unit for the United States Army to bring back Army Ranger units, additional Ranger companies were ordered. The companies were small light infantry special forces units which specialized in infiltration and irregular warfare.

The new 3rd Army Ranger Infantry Company was formulated based on the Table of Organization and Equipment documents of Ranger units in World War II, all of which had been deactivated. The 3rd Ranger Infantry Company was organized into three platoons. A headquarters element of five men oversaw the platoons. However, due to lack of battalion support for clerical, transportation, supply and mess kitchen support, 3rd company had to acquire the personnel, vehicles, and other equipment needed to support their operations. This resulted in the involvement of considerably more highly trained personnel than the five called for by the TOE. Each platoon had three squads of ten men each, with a platoon sergeant and assistant platoon sergeant (a.k.a. platoon guide). Each squad had two fireteams of five men each and one man in each fireteam carried a M1918 Browning Automatic Rifle. The BAR was the largest weapon in the platoon. The 60mm M2 mortars, the 57mm recoilless rifles, and the M20 Super Bazookas were carried on the company M35 2½ ton cargo truck but seldom used. The company was authorized two vehicles; an M38 Jeep and an M35 2½ ton cargo truck. The company was more heavily armed than the Eighth Army Ranger Company but less in strength and fire power than standard infantry companies. Like the other numbered Ranger companies, its organization called for five officers and 107 enlisted men in three platoons. (Note: The Ranger company was assigned no mess, medical, or transportation assets, and so had to be attached to a battalion at all times, as no independent Ranger battalion headquarters was activated in Korea. (Veritas Part 1 2010, p. 44))

The troops for the Ranger company were to be Airborne qualified, so the Ranger Training Center heavily recruited troops from the 82nd Airborne Division and 11th Airborne Division who had already completed United States Army Airborne School. In spite of this, only one Ranger operation in the conflict ever required an airborne landing. At the first Airborne Ranger graduation in November 1950, each Ranger was given a black and gold Ranger Tab as a shoulder sleeve insignia. A few days later, each Ranger was issued a blue and white tab and instructed to sew it above the Ranger Tab. The Airborne Ranger Companies then in Korea were deactivated on August 1, 1951. They were merged into the 187th Airborne Regimental Combat Team to bring them back up to strength with airborne-qualified combat-experienced replacements. The 187th had been moved to Kyushu, Japan's southern island to take on a (then Top Secret) mission to save the UN negotiators at Kaesong, North Korea. All of the Ranger officers and top NCO's met in a mess hall at Camp Chickamauga, Beppu, Kyushu, Japan. Some of the senior NCOs had been World War II Rangers. At this meeting, they designed a scroll-type patch similar to the World War II Ranger patches. In the center, was Ranger on top and Airborne underneath. On the left was the company number. On the right was “Co.”. At a later date, back in the states, more patches were made with Airborne on top and Ranger underneath.

== History ==
=== Formation and training ===
Of a pool of 5,000 applicants, the Ranger Training School selected 22 officers and 314 enlisted men for the first three Ranger companies on 2 October, which were entirely white. A fourth, all African-American company was organized several days later. The 3rd Ranger Infantry Company (Airborne) was organized on 9 October 1950, assuming the lineage of A Company of the 3rd Ranger Battalion. It had an initial strength of 135 enlisted men and five officers. The unit was formally activated on 25 October 1950 at Fort Benning. It was placed under command of Captain Jesse Tidwell and Bob Channon, who would be later promoted to captain and in December, 1950, to executive officer.

The Rangers trained extensively in reconnaissance, long-range patrols, setting up roadblocks, land navigation, camouflage, concealment, and adjusting indirect fire. They undertook frequent live fire exercises, many at night, simulating raids, ambushes and infiltrations. The Rangers trained 60 hours per week and ran 5 miles (8.0 km) each day and frequently held 20 miles (32 km) speed marches, which were considered traditions for Ranger training from World War II. The training for the numbered companies included much of the program used by second lieutenant Ralph Puckett to train the Eighth Army Ranger Company. In spite of a 30 percent dropout rate, most of the men completed the course and graduated 15 November 1950.

While the 1st, 2nd and 4th Ranger Company each embarked for Korea shortly after their training was complete, the 3rd Ranger Company was retained at Fort Benning, to train the next cycle of Rangers along with the 5th, 6th, 7th and 8th Ranger Company. After providing fillers to 1st and 4th companies to cover their training losses, the 3rd had 40 men left. In mid-December, they took an additional 80 men from 7th Company and completed a second cycle of Ranger training. This proved beneficial to the 3rd Company, as it was given cold-weather training alongside the 5th and 8th companies at Fort Carson, Colorado. After the first training cycle was complete; the Ranger units already in Korea had not received this training and were thus unprepared for the Korean winter. The 3rd Company also received additional training which better prepared it for combat, including tactics of the People's Volunteer Army, which the other companies had learned in battle and tracer designation of targets during night attacks. They also received 57mm M18 Recoilless Rifles, however, these were kept on the cargo truck due to the necessity to break up a rifle team to man a crew-served weapon, which didn't happen. The entire company was trained to be their own forward observers for artillery. In March 1951, the 3rd, 5th, and 8th Companies sailed for Korea, a trip which was fraught with frequent discipline problems as the Rangers continuously got into fights with U.S. Marines on board the troopship while en route. After spending one night in Kobe, Japan, the next morning they sailed for Pusan, South Korea.

=== Bloody Nose Ridge ===
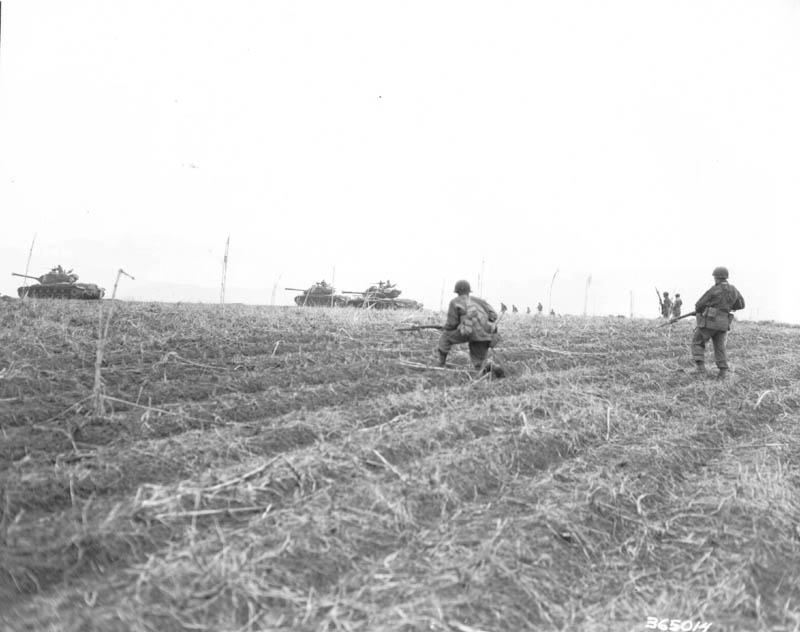
The 3rd Ranger Company advances during its 11 April 1951 mission, approaching what will later be known as "Bloody Nose Ridge."

The Rangers arrived in Korea on 24 March. They disembarked from the Army Transport Ship at Pusan. After spending a night or two there, all three companies continued on to Inchon on an LST Landing Ship, Tank, arriving at Inchon on 31 March. There, 3rd Airborne Ranger Company separated from its sister companies and was attached to the US 3rd Infantry Division near the Imjin River, where the division was engaged in an intense battle with Chinese forces, attempting to push them further north.

The 3rd Ranger Company entered action on 11 April, part of a tank-infantry task force conducting aggressive reconnaissance in a wide valley near the river. Encountering a village, the 3rd Platoon cleared the village and killed two Chinese stragglers. After the lead elements of the tank company and the 3rd Platoon had taken the Kantongyon village, the tank company commander wanted to move his company west into the center of the valley before continuing north. Captain and now Executive Officer, Bob Channon was near the rear of the company column. CO, Jess Tidwell, riding with the tank Co, called Channon on the radio and instructed him to come up and take control of the 1st and 2nd Platoons. By the time Channon reached the two platoons, they were crossing over two small hills just north of Kantongyon. As they crossed over one of the hills, Channon and his radio operator were wounded by Chinese mortar rounds. Channon took the radio from Walker, who was now incapacitated, and joined the two platoons at the bottom of the hill. Channon then called Jess Tidwell for instructions, who responded, “move out when the tanks move out.” Two tanks had passed through a gap in the hills and were in front of them. Soon, the two tanks moved out at high speed to join their company in the center of the valley. As the Rangers started to move forward, toward the nose of a ridge from which the fire was coming about 700-800 yards ahead, they began taking casualties from machine gun and rifle fire. About 100 yards out from the ridge, they received a heavy mortar barrage, resulting in a number of them being wounded. Channon also received a couple of burp gun rounds to his lower left leg. Shortly after, a couple of light tanks arrived. Pete Hamilton (1st Plt Ldr) and Channon crawled up on the tanks, bore-sighted the guns on the machine guns and blew them away. About 30 yards out from a Chinese trench at the base of the ridge nose, they received a heavy volley of grenades. Abandoning protocol (once you start a charge, you are not supposed to hit the ground), Channon, knowing that he'd have no trouble getting his Rangers up again, had them hit the ground. When they got up, the Rangers took the ridge nose in a bayonet and grenade fight. When their position was secure, Platoon Sergeant Barber reported that they only had eight Rangers capable of continuing on. Pete Hamilton had been too seriously wounded to continue. Channon called Tidwell for instructions and was instructed to join the tanks and the 3rd Platoon in the center of the valley. The 2nd Platoon had been supporting the 1st Platoon with enfilade fire on the hill from their left flank. Channon put the 2nd Platoon in the lead, followed by the remnant of the 1st Platoon. The tanks and the 3rd Platoon had moved up the center of the wide valley and were more than a thousand yards to the northwest. Fortunately, after about 300 yards of sniper fire from higher on the ridge to their right, they were able to gain cover from a 3–4 foot field dyke, and then joined the 3rd Platoon in the center of the valley. Channon moved the company up around the tanks on a small hill ahead. The tank company commander then moved the tanks up to the final objective for the day about 300-400 yards ahead. Jess Tidwell was with him, so Channon brought the company up to that small hill and got it organized. Bob Scully, Channon's third radio operator for the day, was wounded when a mortar round hit. Jess Tidwell had Channon get on a tank with other wounded for the trip back to clearing station. On the way back Channon noticed that there was more than a two thousand yard gap before they saw any fighting elements. So before continuing on, he had a jeep take him to the tank battalion CP. He strongly suggested the gap be closed before dark, which was done and 3rd Company was replaced on line. In addition to those wounded who were able to continue on, four Rangers were killed along with 25 wounded and evacuated in this first engagement.

The company then advanced up the valley under sniper and artillery fire until it located and destroyed a Chinese communications and supply center at the end, before returning to 3rd Infantry Division lines. In all, they had killed over 100 Chinese in this fight, and the division commanders considered the mission a success in spite of the high casualty count. In this action, the Rangers adopted a new motto, "Die Bastard, die!" [1] They also picked up the nickname “Cold Steel Third”, when division commander Major General Seoul, who was observing the action with other senior officers, was heard to say, “There go my Rangers. They like that cold steel.”

=== Imjin River missions ===
Despite suffering over 50 percent casualties by this time and with few reinforcements, 3rd Ranger Company remained on the line, and was used as a reconnaissance element for the division. As the 3rd Infantry Division advanced, pressing gains from the Chinese, the company was used to guard a vital bridge over the Hantan River. It then massed with several combat engineers and other division elements to form Task Force Rogers. The task force then probed north searching for Chinese concentrations, but did not encounter any Chinese troops.

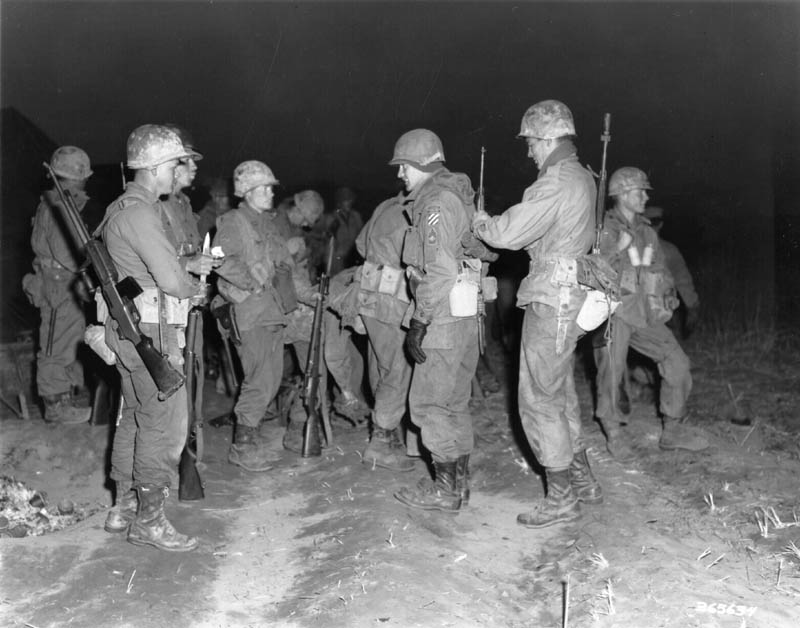
3rd Ranger Company troops check equipment before a reconnaissance parrol along the Imjin River in April 1951.

On 19 April, the Chinese conducted a counteroffensive in the 3rd Infantry Division sector, first striking to the east, followed by a feint that struck near the Rangers' position. The task force was assigned to rescue a group of five 3rd Division tanks that had been disabled 8 miles (13 km) inside Chinese territory. Advancing, they suppressed a Chinese ambush before the Chinese could attack, and advanced under mortar attack and took the hills surrounding the tanks. They then returned the stranded tanks to UN lines at a cost of two wounded.

On 22 April, the Rangers, tanks and engineers conducted another probe of the Chinese positions, to ensure they could not launch a surprise attack on nearby Republic of Korea Army formations. Encountering two Chinese companies dug in at a hill with one route of attack, Tidwell ordered a surprise attack on the hill, which was successful in pushing Chinese forces off the outlying fortifications.

It then moved to reinforce the British 29th Infantry Brigade, which was cut off on Hill 235 after ROK troops folded under attack. After two days of intense fighting and foot marching, the Rangers moved to relieve the British troops, despite itself being at only 67 percent strength. Encountering heavy resistance, they were initially unable to break through Chinese formations to relieve the British.

Chinese forces counterattacked, destroying a 3rd Infantry Division tank column sent to assist the Rangers and attacking the 3rd Ranger Company from three sides, as they dug into a hill. Though the Rangers eventually were forced to withdraw, the defense of the Rangers, the US 3rd Division and the British 29th Brigade had broken the momentum of the Chinese offensive.

=== Target acquisition unit ===
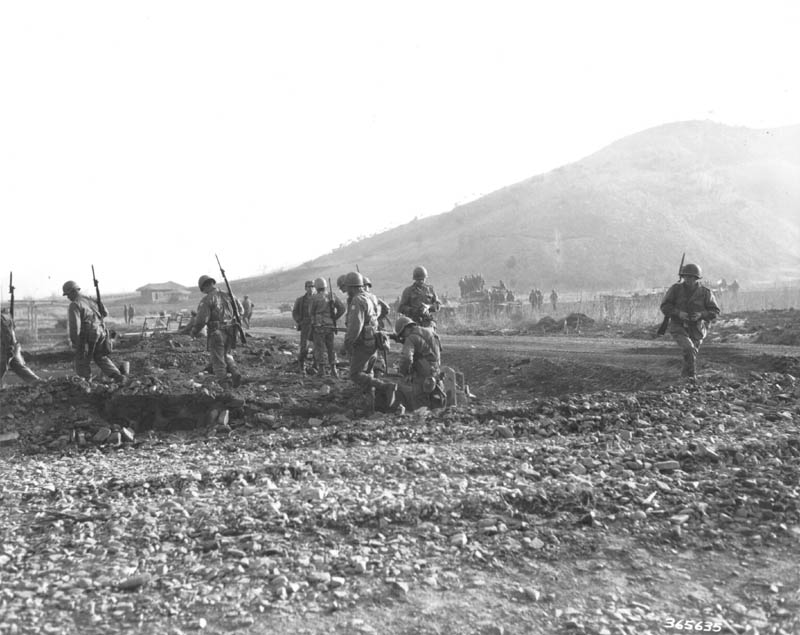
Rangers from 3rd Company prepare for another patrol in Korea in 1951.

The 3rd Infantry Division then moved to the offensive, in early May 1951 they were used to scout for Chinese concentrations and then call in artillery to destroy them. These actions have been viewed by historians as one of few instances where Rangers in Korea were effectively employed, used as a stealthy infiltration force for terrain too difficult for conventional units.

On 11 May, with Chinese forces slackening their offensive, 3rd Ranger Company was recalled to Kimpo Airfield for parachute proficiency training, above the objections of the 3rd Infantry Division commanders who considered the company invaluable. The company spent several weeks in division reserve, and undertook various missions such as convoy security and guarding command posts, as well as surveillance and visiting patrols behind the front lines. In one of these rearguard actions, the Rangers evacuated a rundown village only to have one member of the unit, Corporal David Rawls, captured by three Chinese infiltrators.

By 17 June, the company was returned to the front and operated again as a target acquisition unit. Paired with 3rd Infantry Division's reconnaissance company, an artillery battery and a forward air control party, they became known as "Task Force Ferret." Positioned 6 miles (9.7 km) ahead of the main division positions, the unit was also placed to warn the rest of the lines should the Chinese attack. By this time, however, the front lines in the battle had begun to largely stabilize, and as both armies fortified stationary positions, the Rangers infiltration abilities became unusable.

=== Final mission and disbandment ===
In July, the division was holding on the "Iron Triangle," strategically important and defensible ground. In an attempt to strengthen its forces, the 3rd Infantry Division evacuated hills 682 and 717 at the southern base of the triangle, positioning the Rangers to appear as if they were still manned the hills. After eight days of patrols, Tidwell ordered an aggressive patrol to strike Chinese positions. Over three nights, they ambushed four Chinese patrols, causing several casualties and suffering few of their own.

On 10 July, the U.S. Army ordered the deactivation of all of its Ranger companies. The Army noted that the Ranger companies were only an exercise directed by The Pentagon which was complete. The 3rd Ranger Company was deactivated on 1 August 1951 in Korea. Like many of the other Ranger units, most of the Ranger veterans were folded into the 187th Airborne Regimental Combat Team, where their airborne skills could be used. Still, Operation Tomahawk was the last airborne jump of the war.

== Awards and decorations ==
The 3rd Ranger Infantry Company was awarded three campaign streamers and two unit citations for its service in the Korean War. In 1953, the unit was again designated A Company of the 3rd Battalion, 75th Ranger Regiment; that unit carries on the 3rd Ranger Company's lineage.

Conflict	Streamer	Inscription	Year(s)
	Korean Service Campaign Streamer	First UN Counteroffensive	1950
	Korean Service Campaign Streamer	CCF Spring Offensive	1951
	Korean Service Campaign Streamer	UN Summer-Fall Offensive	1951
A white ribbon with vertical green and red stripes on its edges and a red and blue circle in the middle	Republic of Korea Presidential Unit Citation	(embroidered "UIJONGBU CORRIDOR")	1951
A white ribbon with vertical green and red stripes on its edges and a red and blue circle in the middle	Republic of Korea Presidential Unit Citation	(embroidered "KOREA 1951")	1951
