= 2nd Ranger Infantry Company (United States) =

US Army unit in the Korean War

2nd Ranger Infantry Company (Airborne)
- Active: 9 October 1950 – 1 August 1951
- Country: United States of America
- Allegiance: United States Army
- Branch: Active duty
- Type: Ranger light infantry
- Role: Irregular warfare
- Size: Company
- Part of: Eighth United States Army
- Garrison/HQ: Pusan, South Korea
- Nickname: "Buffalo Rangers"
- Motto: "Buffalo"
- Engagements: Korean War: Operation Tomahawk; Battle of the Soyang River

Commanders
- Notable commanders: Warren E. Allen

The 2nd Ranger Infantry Company (Airborne) was a Ranger light infantry company of the United States Army active during the Korean War. As a small special operations unit, the 2nd Ranger Company specialized in irregular warfare. A segregated unit, all of its personnel, including its officers, were African-Americans.

Activated and trained as a successor organization to the 2nd Ranger Battalion from World War II, the 2nd Ranger Company was formed and trained extensively in airborne warfare. Deployed to South Korea in December 1950, the company quickly adopted the motto of "Buffalo Rangers" and worked extensively as a scouting force for the U.S. 7th Infantry Division. In this role, the company undertook several major operations against the Chinese People's Volunteer Army, including Operation Tomahawk in early 1951.

Even though racial politics often resulted in the company receiving untrained replacements, it performed well in many small-scale engagements during this time. In the summer of 1951, the company was employed along the front line as an advance force to push back Chinese attacks as the front lines became more static. The company was highly regarded for its actions capturing and holding Hill 581 during the Battle of the Soyang River, in which the company inflicted hundreds of casualties on the Chinese without a single Ranger being killed.

Disbanded in August 1951 along with all the other Ranger companies, the unit's soldiers accrued several awards in its 10-month existence. These included four campaign streamers, nine Silver Star Medals and over 100 Purple Heart Medals. Subsequent research has focused on the economy of force of how the Rangers were employed and how their performance was impacted by the racist policies of their time.

== Origins ==
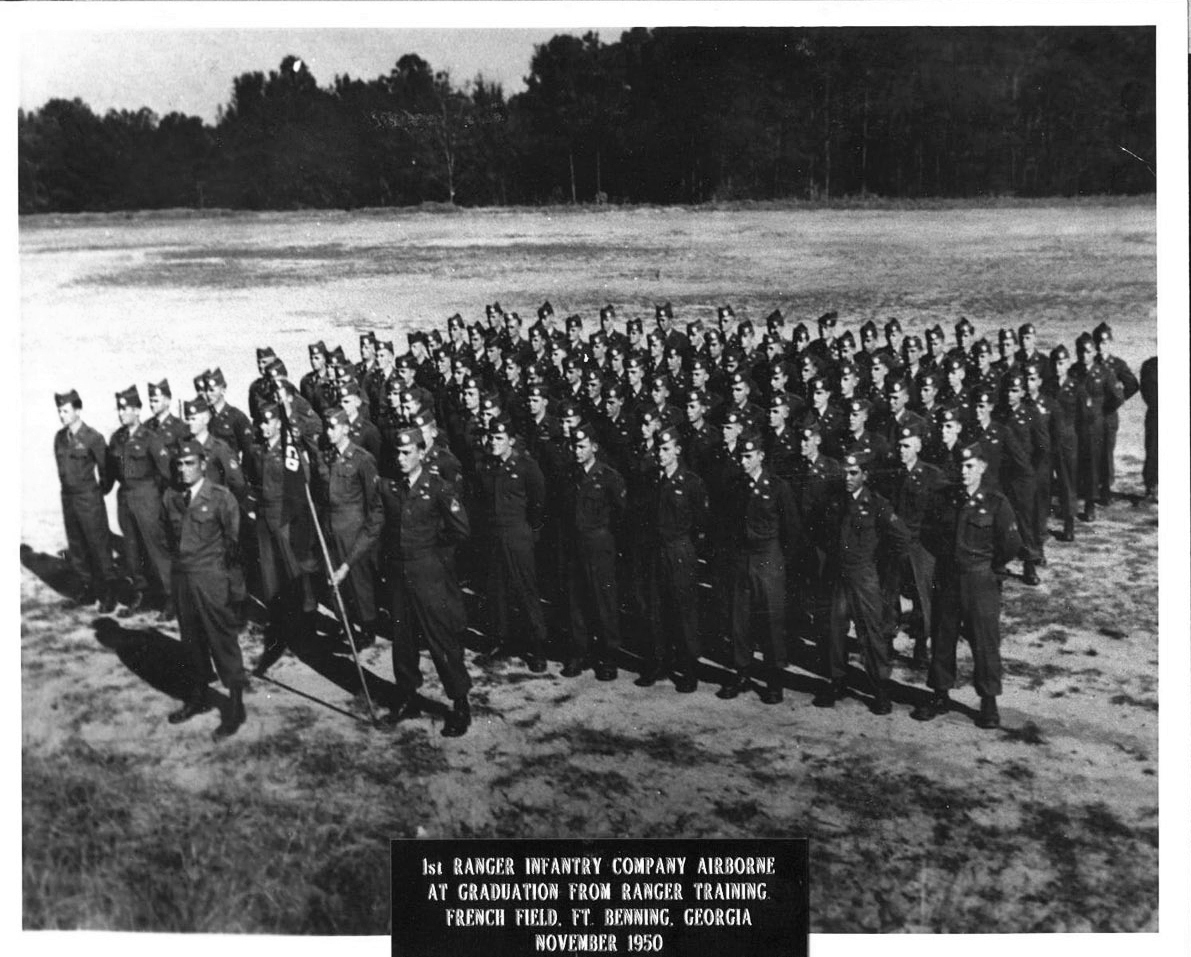
The 1st Ranger Company graduates from Ranger training in November 1950.

On 25 June 1950 the Korean War began when the North Korean People's Army invaded the Republic of Korea (ROK) with 90,000 well-trained and equipped troops who easily overran the smaller and more poorly equipped Republic of Korea Army. In response, the United States (U.S.) and United Nations (UN) began an intervention campaign to prevent South Korea from collapsing. The U.S. troops engaged the North Koreans first at the Battle of Osan where they were badly defeated on 5 July by the better-trained North Koreans. From there, the U.S. and UN suffered a steady stream of defeats that pushed them back to the Pusan Perimeter by August. At the same time, North Korean agents began to infiltrate behind UN lines and attack military targets and cities.

UN units, spread out along the Pusan Perimeter, had a difficult time repelling these units as they were untrained in combating guerrilla warfare. North Korean special forces units like the NK 766th Independent Infantry Regiment had great success in defeating ROK troops, prompting U.S. Army Chief of Staff General J. Lawton Collins to order the creation of an elite force which could "infiltrate through enemy lines and attack command posts, artillery, tank parks, and key communications centers or facilities." All U.S. Army Ranger units, which had previously undertaken this role, had been disbanded after World War II because they required time-consuming training, specialization, and expensive equipment. With the defeat of the NK 766th Regiment at the Battle of P'ohang-dong, and the strength of U.S. infantry units in question, U.S. commanders felt the recreation of Ranger units was essential. In early August as the Battle of Pusan Perimeter began, the Eighth United States Army ordered Lieutenant Colonel John H. McGee, the head of its G-3 Operations miscellaneous division, to create a new experimental Army Ranger unit, the Eighth Army Ranger Company, to trial the concept of reestablishing small light infantry companies that specialized in infiltration and irregular warfare. In the meantime, the Ranger Training Center was established at Fort Benning, Georgia.

=== Organization ===
With the successful development of the Eighth Army Ranger Company, the establishment of additional Ranger companies was ordered. The composition of the new 2nd Army Ranger Infantry Company was formulated on the Table of Organization and Equipment documents of the World War II Ranger units. The 2nd Ranger Infantry Company was organized into three heavily armed platoons, which were overseen by a headquarters element of five men. Each platoon comprised 36 men in three squads: two assault squads and one heavy weapons squad. Each platoon was also furnished with 60 mm M2 mortars, M20 Super Bazookas, and M1918 Browning Automatic Rifles. One sniper was designated for each platoon, with the remainder of the troops being equipped with M1 Garand and M2 Carbine rifles. They were authorized two vehicles: an M38 Jeep and an M35 2½ ton cargo truck. Overall, the company was far more heavily armed than both the Eighth Army Ranger Company and standard infantry companies. Like the other numbered Ranger companies, its organization called for 5 officers and 107 enlisted men. (Note: The Ranger company was assigned no mess, medical, or transportation assets, and so had to be attached to a battalion at all times, as no independent Ranger battalion headquarters was activated in Korea. (Veritas Part 1 2010, p. 44))

The troops for the Ranger company were to be Airborne qualified, so the Ranger Training Center heavily recruited troops from the 82nd Airborne Division and 11th Airborne Division who had already completed United States Army Airborne School. In spite of this, only one Ranger operation in the conflict ever required an airborne landing. They initially wore a black and gold scroll as a shoulder sleeve insignia, but that insignia was later redesignated the Ranger Tab and the Rangers adopted a black, red and white scroll similar to that unofficially worn by Ranger Battalions in World War II.

Soon after arriving in Korea, the unit took to the nickname "Buffalo Rangers," which U.S. newspapers had applied to the unit as a homage to the Buffalo Soldiers. "Buffalo" subsequently became both the division's motto as well as its password for patrols upon their return to company lines. The 2nd Ranger Company was the only Ranger company in the history of the U.S. Army to consist entirely of African-Americans.

== History ==
=== Formation and training ===
The U.S. Army, which up until that point typically did not allow African-American soldiers to serve in special forces units, authorized African-Americans to apply to become Rangers. However, in spite of Executive Order 9981, which had de-segregated the U.S. military in 1948, the Army opted to pool all black applicants into one company. By 1950, most units were still de facto segregated, and in the 82nd Airborne Division, Ranger applicants came from the all-black units including the 3rd Battalion, 505th Airborne Infantry, the 758th Tank Battalion and the 80th Anti-Aircraft Artillery Battalion. Many of the applicants were World War II veterans who had seen combat, and many others had served with the 555th Parachute Infantry Battalion.

Of a pool of 5,000 applicants, on 2 October the Ranger Training School selected 22 officers and 314 enlisted men for the first three Ranger companies, which were entirely white. A fourth, all African-American company was organized several days later. The 2nd Ranger Infantry Company (Airborne) was organized on 9 October 1950, assuming the lineage of A Company of the 2nd Ranger Battalion. It had an initial strength of 135 enlisted men and 5 officers under the command of First Lieutenant Warren E. Allen, company commander, and Second Lieutenant James C. Queen, executive officer. Originally it had been designated the 4th Ranger Infantry Company (Airborne), but the two companies switched designations, apparently to prevent accusations of racial discrimination. The unit was formally activated on 25 October 1950 at Fort Benning.

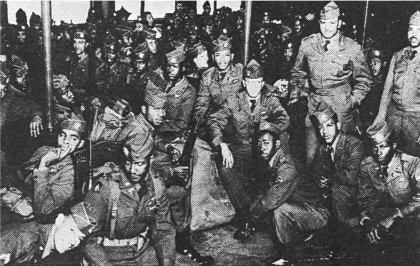
The 2nd Ranger Company on a ferry in San Francisco, en route to Korea in 1950.

The Rangers trained extensively in reconnaissance, long-range patrols, motorized scouting, setting up roadblocks, land navigation, camouflage, concealment, and adjusting indirect fire. They undertook frequent live fire exercises, many at night, simulating raids, ambushes and infiltrations. The Rangers trained 60 hours per week and ran 5 miles (8.0 km) each day and frequently held 20 miles (32 km) speed marches, which were considered traditions for Ranger training from World War II. The training for the numbered companies included much of the program used by Second Lieutenant Ralph Puckett to train the Eighth Army Ranger Company. In spite of a 30 percent dropout rate, most of the men completed the course and graduated on 15 November 1950. The Rangers left Fort Benning on 3 December and traveled to Camp Stoneman, California, with the 4th Ranger Company. They sailed for Japan on 9 December aboard the transport USS General H.W. Butner bound for the front lines in the Korean War. The company arrived at Yokohama, Japan, on 24 December, and was flown from Tachikawa Air Base to Taegu five days later.

=== Korea ===
Arriving in Korea at 11:15 on 30 December, the 2nd Ranger Company was attached to the 32nd Regimental Combat Team, 7th Infantry Division, X Corps which was regrouping in Yonchon having been badly mauled in the Battle of Chosin Reservoir, a battle which signaled the unexpected entry of Chinese troops into the war. The next day, the division was ordered to Tanyang and Wonju to block Chinese southward advance along main roads and railroads in the area. On 6 January the Rangers arrived at Changnim-ni with the regimental headquarters, where they were used as a security element for its medical units to protect them from infiltration. The Rangers established counter-guerrilla patrols around the regiment's main aid station and headquarters. They first saw combat at 02:00 on 7 January, driving off 20 North Korean guerrillas who had inadvertently run into one of their roadblocks. They then repulsed a company-sized second attack on the position. In this action, the Rangers lost their first killed in action, Sergeant First Class Isaac Baker, as well as three wounded. The North Koreans had 50 killed. At 09:00 9 January, 3rd Platoon conducted a patrol to Changnim where they ambushed an advance North Korean patrol, killing 11 while suffering one wounded in a six-hour firefight from 09:00 to 14:45. The company soon created a "curfew," attacking anyone they encountered after dark, a move which effectively disrupted communications and resupply to the local Chinese guerrilla unit, which instead opted to move out of the Rangers' area of operation.

On 14 January, the Rangers formed the armored spearhead of the 1st Battalion, 32nd Infantry attack on the village of Majori-ri, as part of an offensive to push Chinese forces back from the Tanyang area. The company entered the village at 07:30 and was ambushed by a battalion of Chinese troops entrenched there in fortified positions. The Rangers were able to capture the village and fend off a counterattack with their heavy weapons, suffering five killed and five wounded while killing 100 Chinese soldiers. However, as it moved to reinforce another U.S. infantry company advancing north, the 2nd Ranger Company was hit by a strong Chinese counterattack, and was forced to withdraw after running out of ammunition. It suffered another six killed and three wounded.

"Colored troops who arrive in this division, if they have the proper MOS, will be assigned to the 2nd Ranger Company. Others who are assigned by error will be returned to the Eighth Army Replacement Battalion. Personnel will not be mixed within units. If Ranger Company becomes overstrength, another company will be formed."

—Major General Ned Almond's controversial order to keep the 2nd Ranger Company segregated by assigning non-Ranger black troops and blocking white Ranger replacements.

Continued patrols and skirmishes in the Tanyang area, as well as non-battle casualties to frostbite and sickness in the middle of the Korean winter, whittled down the 2nd Ranger Company to 67 men by the end of January. X Corps commander Major General Ned Almond ordered all black replacements to be sent to the Ranger company, even though they had not been trained as Rangers. This action, seen as a racist move by historians, was done to keep Almond's troops segregated. Although Ranger replacements were in short supply and the order effectively ensured that the company was brought back to at full strength, it nevertheless reduced the company's effectiveness. Reinforcements from many career fields, including many non-combat troops, joined the company and had to be retrained.

The 7th Infantry Division reached full strength and saw action around Chungju and Pyeongchang as part of an effort to push the North Korean and Chinese forces back above the 38th parallel and away from Seoul. In early February, the 7th Infantry Division engaged in a series of successful "limited objective" small unit attacks and ambushes before advancing slowly as it cleared enemy hilltop positions throughout the remainder of the month. In this time, the 2nd Ranger Company acted as a probing force and spearhead for attacks. On 20 February it led the 17th Infantry Regiment in an attack on Chuchon, taking the town from a superior force of Chinese troops. The action was undertaken with several war correspondents observing the battle, bringing international attention to the Ranger unit. The Rangers were commended for a particularly aggressive attack in which they pursued and surprised a Chinese column moving into the village, persisting in their attack with fixed bayonets even when it became apparent that the Chinese force was larger than anticipated. The Chinese were routed in heavy fighting. A few days later, field commanders reported to The Pentagon that the company was performing extremely well, and it was pulled from the lines for a new mission.

=== Operation Tomahawk ===
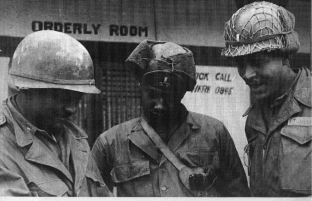
Captain Warren Allen, company commander, 1st Lieutenant Vincent "Willie" Wilburn, 2nd Platoon Leader, and 1st Lieutenant James "Mother" Queen, the company's executive officer, in front of the company's command post at Tanyang Pass in 1951.

On 28 February 1951, the 2nd Ranger Company was attached to the 187th Airborne Regimental Combat Team (RCT), alongside the 4th Ranger Infantry Company, and began unit training jumps and tactical exercises in preparation for a combat parachute drop. These exercises continued throughout March 1951, as much of the UN force conducted the aggressive Operation Ripper as a large-scale counteroffensive against the Chinese and North Korean forces. To follow-up this attack, Lieutenant General Matthew Ridgway, commander of the Eighth Army, planned Operation Tomahawk, a mission to insert the 187th RCT and the Rangers behind the Chinese lines to cut off Chinese supplies and force them to retreat north of Seoul. During the three weeks of training, the Rangers were reinforced by another platoon of African-American Rangers directly from Ranger school under Lieutenant Antonio Anthony.

On 23 March, the 187th and attached Rangers were dropped around Munsan-ni, 24 miles (39 km) northwest of Seoul, with the mission to hold an airhead to interfere with the Chinese and North Korean logistical network, and linkup with the 6th Medium Tank Battalion 18 hours after drop. The force of 3,500 left Taegu in 150 transports, over the Yellow Sea and over the North Korean coast. The 2nd Ranger Company dropped from its aircraft at 09:15, the first time in history U.S. Army Rangers conducted an aerial insertion into combat. Suffering only two Rangers injured from the jump, the force was nonetheless able to surprise and capture several positions of the NK 19th Division.

The Rangers massed and moved south to a terrain feature known as Hill 151, the linkup point with the 6th Tank Battalion. The company surprised and overwhelmed a Chinese platoon in a village 1 mile (1.6 km) north of the hill, killing six and capturing twenty. They then took the hill despite North Korean resistance, killing eleven and capturing one, and forcing two platoons of North Koreans to retreat from the hill. The Rangers suffered one killed and two wounded. By 18:00 they had linked up with the advancing 64th Medium Tank Battalion of the U.S. 3rd Infantry Division. Over the next five days, the Rangers commenced mopping up North Korean and Chinese resistance, advancing 20 miles (32 km) north.

=== Retraining and lull ===
In April, the 2nd Ranger Infantry Company was reattached to the 7th Infantry Division, this time to the 31st Regimental Combat Team. The company spent the month training replacements, with up to 400 enlisted men filtering into the company. By May, the process of transferring these men to other units began as U.S. Army units throughout Korea, driven by necessity, began slowly desegregating. The Rangers eventually settled at a force of 123 men, among them the first white member of the unit, medic Joe Russo.

By May, the Rangers were emplaced at Hill 258, on the front lines between the 31st RCT and the 7th Marine Regiment of the U.S. 1st Marine Division. They conducted frequent patrols along an outpost network, often encountering and engaging Chinese troops. They fortified the hill and surrounding areas, which served as an advance outpost to warn the 7th Infantry Division if the Chinese attacked. During this period, the fighting entered a lull, and troops resumed their rest and recuperation rotations. Allen, Pryor, and Freeman left on one such rotation with a number of men, leaving Queen and only 80 enlisted men on the hill.

=== Hill 581 ===
Shortly after this, however, Chinese infiltrators began appearing regularly in the undermanned 2nd Company's area, and by 15 May, Queen discovered the Chinese were moving in force to Hill 581, several miles from their position, from which the Chinese could fortify and attack Hill 258. Queen led the platoon on a sneak attack of the Chinese force on 17 May, covered by 7th Division artillery fire. At 15:00, they engaged the surprised Chinese, conducting a double envelopment supported by continued artillery fire. By 17:00, the Rangers secured Hill 581 from the Chinese, who suffered 50 killed and 90 wounded in the attack.

Chinese troops counterattacked in force at 23:00, with two battalions of infantry supported by snipers and mortar fire. Aided by 7th Division artillery fire, the Rangers held the hill against Chinese resistance. The Rangers repulsed four successive Chinese assaults by one of the battalions, expending all of their grenades by 02:00 on 18 May, and running short on ammunition by 03:00. At that point, the second Chinese battalion commenced its assault, surprising the Rangers and driving them from the peak of Hill 581. Queen counterattacked and retook the hill by 05:00. At 06:45, the Chinese gave up the attack, having been severely mauled. In the unsuccessful attempt to take Hill 581, Chinese losses amounted to at least 120 killed and several hundred injured. The Rangers, having relied on tight interlocking crossfire and well dug-in positions, suffered only 10 wounded in the battle. Commanders in the 7th Infantry Division were stunned by the 2nd Ranger Company's effectiveness in the fight, and as a result of the action, the company came to be considered a model unit.

The 2nd Ranger Company then moved east to help relieve the 7th Marines, which was reeling from Chinese attacks. In three days of intermittent fighting, the company conducted a number of search and destroy missions. This culminated in an attack on Hill 545, where an estimated company of Chinese troops, who had previously pushed the Marines back, were themselves surprised by the Rangers and forced to withdraw, losing 15 killed to the Rangers' two wounded.

=== Final battles and disbandment ===
In June 1951, with peace talks underway in Panmunjom, the Ranger company was employed aggressively in offensive roles as a means to secure a better position for the UN at the bargaining table. After a number of operations north of the 38th parallel with the 7th Division, on 8 June the Rangers were moved to attack Hill 772, an operation crafted by Allen to win a strategically advantageous high ground position along the front line. That morning, the company, with support from 7th Division artillery, advanced on the hill, which was first blanketed with napalm strikes from U.S. Air Force P-51 Mustangs. Chinese forces resisted sporadically but withdrew at the end of the day having lost eight men killed and another thirty wounded. Against this the Rangers had lost only seven wounded. On 11 July, the Rangers continued the attack, backed by the 31st RCT who seized high ground near Sanying-ni and forced Chinese troops to retreat further. In this attack, one Ranger was killed and eight were wounded.

Following this, another lull in fighting along the 38th parallel occurred, during which both sides took time to fortify their positions and conduct fewer patrols. As the need for offensive action diminished, on 10 July, the U.S. Army ordered the deactivation of all of its Ranger companies. In doing so, the Army noted that the establishment of the Ranger companies had only been a trial directed by The Pentagon, which had been completed. The decision was further clarified in relation to the 2nd Ranger Company, with the Army stating that "racial differences" had prevented the company from being used effectively in offensive operations.

As a result of the decision to disband the Ranger units, the 2nd Ranger Company was deactivated on 1 August 1951 while it was still in Korea. Like many of the other Ranger units, most of the 2nd Ranger Company veterans were folded into the 187th RCT. As an airborne unit, it was believed that by sending the men to the 187th, their airborne skills could be used. Nevertheless, in the end it turned out that Operation Tomahawk was the last airborne jump of the war and as a result, the former Rangers did not get a chance to exercise these skills again.

== Awards and decorations ==
The 2nd Ranger Infantry Company was awarded four campaign streamers for its service in the Korean War. In 1955, the unit was again designated A Company of the 2nd Battalion, 75th Ranger Regiment, and that unit carries on the 2nd Ranger Company's lineage.

Conflict	Streamer	Inscription	Year(s)
	Korean Service Campaign Streamer	CCF Intervention	1950
	Korean Service Campaign Streamer	First UN Counteroffensive (with Arrowhead device)	1950
	Korean Service Campaign Streamer	CCF Spring Offensive	1951
	Korean Service Campaign Streamer	UN Summer-Fall Offensive	1951

Rangers of the company also received numerous individual decorations. Nine Rangers received Silver Star Medals (Note: These Rangers were: Warren E. Allen, Norman Collins, Curtis Courts, James Freeman, John A. Jones, James Peteress, Edward Posey, James C. Queen, and George Rankins. (Posey 2009, p. 194)) and 11 received Bronze Star Medals. A total of 103 Purple Heart Medals were awarded to 84 members of the company, with 11 Rangers receiving two Purple Hearts and four Rangers receiving three.

== Analysis ==
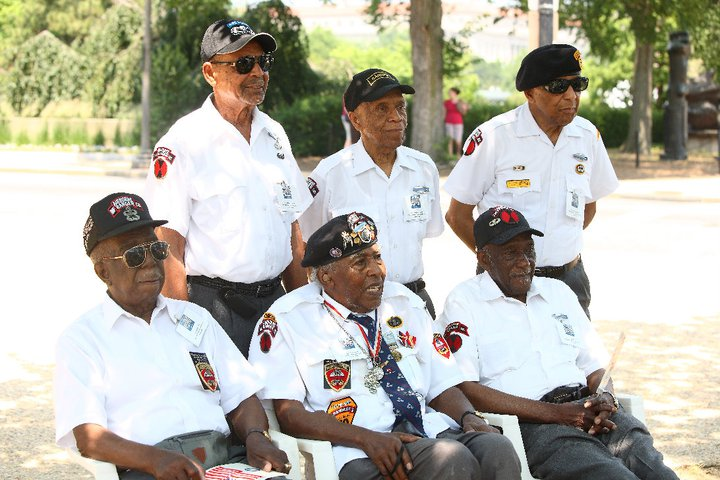
Veterans of the 2nd Ranger Company reunited during a Memorial Day parade in 2011.

The 2nd Ranger Infantry Company was one of sixteen Ranger companies formed in 1950, and one of seven to see combat in Korea. Subsequent military science studies of the Korean War Rangers have analyzed their economy of force, focusing on how well the U.S. military employed the Rangers as special forces. In a thorough analysis of the operations of all Ranger units in the Korean War, Major Chelsea Y. Chae proposed in a 1996 thesis to the U.S. Army Command and General Staff College that Rangers in Korea were misused and ineffective. Chae contended that the Ranger formations' lack of support personnel made them a logistical and administrative liability, as they had to be attached to conventional units for support. Furthermore, Chae argued that the small size of the Ranger units (Note: The Ranger companies were allowed a strength of 112 to 122 men, as compared to the standard infantry company strength of 211. (Veritas Part 2 2010, p. 3)) meant they lacked the manpower to conduct basic tactical maneuvers, and their employment with divisional elements meant they did not have the necessary intelligence information to conduct effective infiltration operations. He concluded that these problems were due to "lack of understanding of Ranger capabilities, limitations inherent in Rangers' force structure, and basic distrust of elite forces."

In his own 2003 thesis, Lieutenant Colonel Victor J. Bond said the 2nd Ranger Company's performance in Korea had been exemplary, in spite of racial discrimination against it. The troops, who had already been well trained members of airborne units before joining the company, quickly gained cohesion and were exceptional soldiers. Bond also contended that the Rangers did not properly receive credit for their actions in Korea, noting the company did not receive the Republic of Korea Presidential Unit Citation or the U.S. Presidential Unit Citation even though units to which they were attached were decorated. Bond also said many of the accomplishments of the company were attributed to white units, due in part to the command climate precipitated by Almond.

== Finnigan's War ==
The 2nd Ranger Infantry Company was honored in the 2013 Korean War documentary "Finnigan's War" directed by Conor Timmis. Members of the 2nd Ranger Infantry Company interviewed in the film include Herculano Dias, Donald Allen and Paul T. Lyles. Ranger Herculano Dias recalls the unit's unique combat accomplishments. Ranger Paul T. Lyles recalls his harrowing encounter with a North Korean tree sniper. Ranger Donald Allen recalls caring for a wounded white soldier and ends his interview with the line "when the bullets start to fly, everyone is the same color".
