= 5th Ranger Company (United States) =

5th Ranger Infantry Company (Airborne)
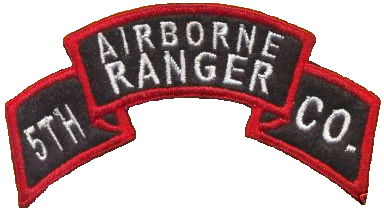
- Scroll of the 5th ranger company
- Active: November 20, 1950 - 1 August 1951
- Country: United States of America
- Allegiance: United States Army
- Branch: Active duty
- Type: Ranger light infantry
- Role: Irregular warfare
- Size: Company
- Part of: Eighth United States Army
- Garrison/HQ: Pusan, South Korea
- Engagements: Korean War

Commanders
- Notable commanders: Captain John C. "Nail" Scagnelli

The 5th Ranger Infantry Company (Airborne) was an airborne trained light infantry unit of the United States Army during the Korean War. The 5th Rangers were trained by 3rd Ranger Company as part of the second cycle of Ranger companies at Fort Benning, Georgia, which also included the 6th, 7th, and 8th Ranger Companies. The 5th Rangers also received winter training at Fort Carson, Colorado.

The 5th Rangers were assigned to the US Army's 25th Infantry Division from April 31, 1951, to its inactivation on August 1, 1951.
