= 1st Ranger Infantry Company (United States) =

US Army unit in the Korean War

1st Ranger Infantry Company (Airborne)
- Active: 25 September 1950 - 1951
- Country: United States of America
- Allegiance: United States Army
- Branch: Active duty
- Type: Ranger light infantry
- Role: Irregular warfare
- Size: Company
- Part of: Eighth United States Army
- Garrison/HQ: Pusan, South Korea
- Engagements: Korean War

Commanders
- Notable commanders: John Striegel; Alfred Herman

The 1st Ranger Infantry Company (Airborne) was a Ranger light infantry company of the United States Army active during the Korean War. As a small special forces unit, it specialized in irregular warfare.

== Organization ==
With the successful development of the Eighth Army Ranger Company as a "test" unit for the United States Army to bring back Army Ranger units; additional Ranger companies were ordered. The companies were small light infantry special forces units which specialized in infiltration and irregular warfare.

The new 1st Army Ranger Infantry Company was formulated based on the Table of Organization and Equipment documents of Ranger units in World War II, all of which had been deactivated. The 1st Ranger Infantry Company was organized into three heavily armed platoons. A headquarters element of five men oversaw the platoons. Each platoon comprised 36 men in three squads, two assault squads and one heavy weapons squad. Each platoon was also furnished with 60mm M2 mortars, M20 Super Bazookas, and M1918 Browning Automatic Rifles. One sniper was designated for each platoon, with the remainder of the troops equipped with M1 Garand and M2 Carbine rifles. They were authorized two vehicles; an M38 Jeep and an M35 2½ ton cargo truck. Overall, the company was far more heavily armed than both the Eighth Army Ranger Company and standard infantry companies. Like the other numbered Ranger companies, its organization called for five officers and 107 enlisted men in three platoons. (Note: The Ranger company was assigned no mess, medical, or transportation assets, and so had to be attached to a battalion at all times, as no independent Ranger battalion headquarters was activated in Korea. (Veritas Part 1 2010, p. 44))

The troops for the Ranger company were to be Airborne qualified, so the Ranger Training Center heavily recruited troops from the 82nd Airborne Division and 11th Airborne Division who had already completed United States Army Airborne School. In spite of this, only one Ranger operation in the conflict ever required an airborne landing. They initially wore a black and gold scroll as a shoulder sleeve insignia, but that insignia was later redesignated the Ranger Tab and the Rangers adopted a black, red and white scroll similar to that unofficially worn by Ranger Battalions in World War II.

== History ==
=== Origins ===
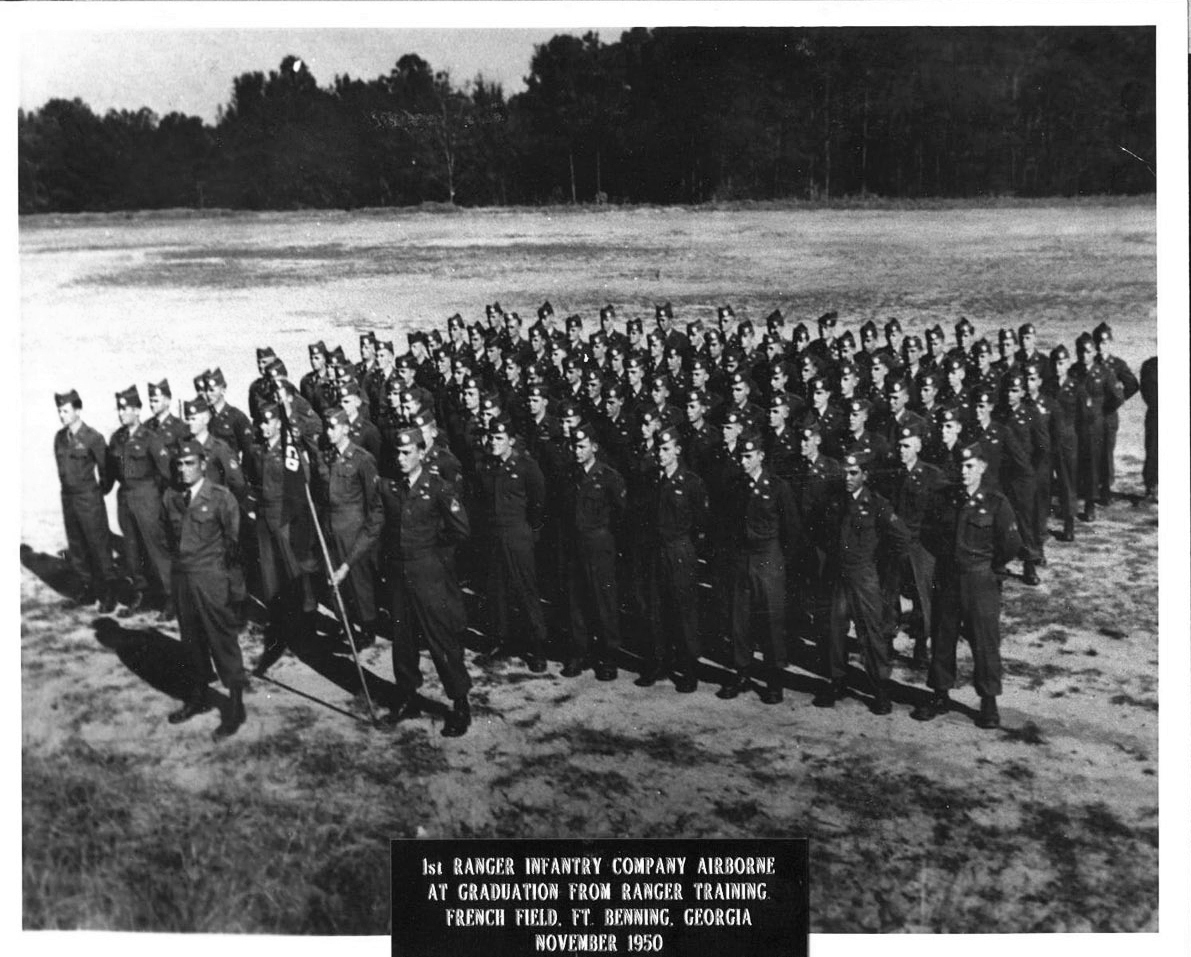
The 1st Ranger Company graduates from Ranger training in November 1950.

With the 25 June 1950 outbreak of the Korean War, the North Korean People's Army had invaded the Republic of Korea (ROK) with 90,000 well-trained and equipped troops who had easily overrun the smaller and more poorly equipped Republic of Korea Army. The United States (U.S.) and United Nations (UN) began an intervention campaign to prevent South Korea from collapsing. The U.S. troops engaged the North Koreans first at the Battle of Osan, being badly defeated on 5 July by the better-trained North Koreans. From there, the U.S. and UN saw a steady stream of defeats until they had been pushed back to the Pusan Perimeter by August. At the same time, North Korean agents began to infiltrate behind UN lines and attack military targets and cities. UN units, spread out along the Pusan Perimeter, were having a difficult time repelling these units as they were untrained in combating guerrilla warfare. North Korean special forces units like the NK 766th Independent Infantry Regiment had seen great success in defeating ROK troops, prompting Army Chief of Staff general J. Lawton Collins to order the creation of an elite force which could "infiltrate through enemy lines and attack command posts, artillery, tank parks, and key communications centers or facilities." All U.S. Army Ranger units had been disbanded after World War II because they required time-consuming training, specialization, and expensive equipment. With the defeat of the NK 766th Regiment at the Battle of P'ohang-dong, and the strength of U.S. infantry units in question, U.S. commanders felt recreating Ranger units was essential. In early August as the Battle of Pusan Perimeter was beginning, the Eighth United States Army ordered lieutenant colonel John H. McGee, the head of its G-3 Operations miscellaneous division, created a new experimental Army Ranger unit, the Eighth Army Ranger Company. In the meantime, the Ranger Training Center was established at Fort Benning, Georgia.

Of a pool of 5,000 applicants, the Ranger Training School selected 22 officers and 314 enlisted men for the first three Ranger companies. A fourth, all African-American company was organized several days later. The 1st Ranger Infantry Company (Airborne) was organized on September 29, 1950, assuming the lineage of A Company of the 1st Ranger Battalion. It had an initial strength of 120 men under the command of Captain John Striegel. The Rangers trained extensively in reconnaissance, long-range patrols, motorized scouting, setting uproadblocks, land navigation, camouflage, concealment, and adjusting indirect fire. They undertook frequent live fire exercises, many at night, simulating raids, ambushes and infiltrations. The Rangers trained 60 hours per week and ran 5 miles (8.0 km) each day and frequently held 20 miles (32 km) speed marches, which were considered traditions for Ranger training from World War II. In spite of a 30 percent dropout rate, most of the men completed the course and graduated 15 November 1950. The Rangers were then sent to Camp Stoneman, California. Ten days later on 25 November, they sailed for Japan to be moved to the front lines in the Korean War.

=== Korean War ===
The 1st Ranger Company undertook equipping in Sasebo, Japan before arriving in Pusan, South Korea where they were trucked to the 2nd Infantry Division on 23 December, where they would be attached. The 2nd Infantry Division, which was south of Seoul, had been badly mauled in the Battle of the Ch'ongch'on River earlier in the month, and were rebuilding. The company was attached to the 23rd Infantry Regiment, causing animosity as food and water were in short supply.

The company began front line patrols on 26 December, and in the course of these patrols began suffering casualties, including one four-man patrol which was captured by Chinese troops and subsequently died or went missing in prison camps. Striegel contracted severe hepatitis and was evacuated, replaced on 6 January 1951 by Lieutenant Alfred Herman, his executive officer. The next day, 7 January, the company was moved with the 2nd Division to Wonju, where the Chinese advanced against the division in the First and Second Battles of Wonju. The 1st Ranger Company fought in this battle, first conducting night patrols to screen Chinese movements, then destroying bridges to slow the Chinese advance as the 2nd Infantry Division lost the town.

As the Chinese attempted to advance, the Rangers were employed as a counter-infiltration force, conducting defensive patrols and burning vacant buildings to stem the Chinese advance. As the bitter cold and snow hampered actions around Wonju, the Rangers were also employed as forward observers and snipers, as their nighttime movement was limited. The Rangers began conducting frequent long range patrols, frequently coming into ambush and relying heavily on artillery and supporting units to cover them, and instead fought few engagements on their own.

On 16 January the company conducted its first mission as a single unit, a probe north of the front lines to scout Chinese positions. The division used the rangers as a scouting force ahead of a planned counteroffensive.

In February in 1951, The 1st Ranger Company fought in the Battle of Chipyong-ni.

=== Awards and decorations ===
The 1st Ranger Infantry Company was awarded four campaign streamers for its service in the Korean War.

Conflict	Streamer	Inscription	Year(s)
	Korean Service Campaign Streamer	CCF Intervention	1950
	Korean Service Campaign Streamer	First UN Counteroffensive	1950
	Korean Service Campaign Streamer	CCF Spring Offensive	1951
	Korean Service Campaign Streamer	UN Summer-Fall Offensive	1951
