= 4th Ranger Infantry Company (United States) =

US Army unit in the Korean War

4th Ranger Infantry Company (Airborne)
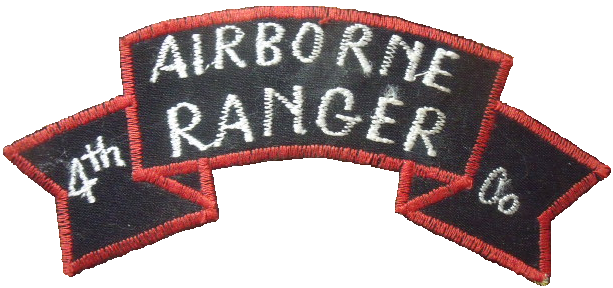
- Scroll of the 4th ranger company
- Active: November 20, 1950 – August 1, 1951
- Country: United States of America
- Allegiance: United States Army
- Branch: Active duty
- Type: Ranger light infantry
- Role: Irregular warfare
- Size: Company
- Part of: Eighth United States Army
- Garrison/HQ: Pusan, South Korea
- Engagements: Korean War

Commanders
- Notable commanders: Captain Dorsey B. Anderson

The 4th Ranger Infantry Company (Airborne) was an airborne-trained infantry unit that was part of the United States Army during the Korean War. The 4th Rangers were created as a result of the actions of North Korean Special Forces units such as the KPA's 766th Independent Infantry Regiment that were overrunning Republic of Korea Army (ROK) and United Nations (UN) units. North Korean special units that were trained in the art of unconventional warfare were beating the ROK and UN units that were stationed in South Korea, pushing them back towards the Pusan Perimeter.

With the creation of the Eighth Army Ranger Company on August 24, 1950, the US Army established the first of fifteen airborne-qualified Ranger companies. On October 28, 1950, the next four Ranger companies were formed. The soldiers that formed these companies came from a number of units. Those that were drawn from the 82nd Airborne Division's 505th Parachute Infantry Regiment and 80th Anti-Aircraft Artillery Battalion were used to form the 4th Ranger Infantry Company before it was redesigned the 2nd Ranger Infantry Company (Airborne). The reestablished 4th Ranger company was resupplied with rangers from the 3rd Ranger Company (which was a training company at the time). The 2nd and 4th Ranger companies deployed from the United States to Korea on December 9, 1950.

When deployed to Korea the 4th Rangers were assigned to both the Headquarters of the Eighth United States Army and the 1st Cavalry Division. In February 1951 the 4th Rangers, along with the 2nd Ranger Company, were assigned to the 187th Airborne Regimental Combat Team. The unit remained a part of the 187th RCT until April 4, 1951.
