= Economy of force =

Principle of war

Economy of force is one of the nine Principles of War, based upon Carl von Clausewitz's approach to warfare. It is the principle of employing all available combat power in the most effective way possible, in an attempt to allocate a minimum of essential combat power to any secondary efforts. It is the judicious employment and distribution of forces towards the primary objective of any person's conflict. Economy of force is the reciprocal of mass.

No part of a force should ever be left without purpose. The allocation of available combat power to such tasks, like limited attacks, defense, delays, deception or even retrograde operations is measured, in order to achieve mass at decisive points elsewhere on the battlefield.

Carl von Clausewitz once said that "Every unnecessary expenditure of time, every unnecessary detour, is a waste of power, and therefore contrary to the principles of strategy."

The Principles of War are a part of United States Army doctrine. The current doctrinal manual for army operations is FM 3–0 Operations, which defines, and describes, economy of force as follows: "Allocate minimum essential combat power to secondary efforts. Economy of force is the reciprocal of mass. It requires accepting prudent risk in selected areas to achieve superiority—overwhelming effects—in the decisive operation. Economy of force involves the discriminating employment and distribution of forces. Commanders never leave any element without a purpose. When the time comes to execute, all elements should have tasks to perform."

== See also ==
- Carl Von Clausewitz's Vom Krieg (On War)
- J.F.C. Fuller's The Nine Principles of War.
- Col. John Boyd's OODA loop (Observe, Orient, Decide, and Act) theory.
