= Ralph Puckett =

U.S. Army Medal of Honor recipient (1926–2024)

Ralph Puckett Jr.
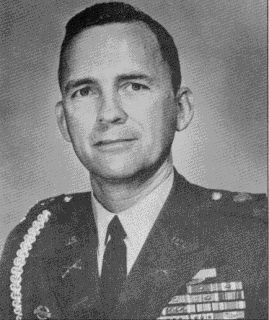
- COL Ralph Puckett, Jr.
- Born: December 8, 1926; Tifton, Georgia, U.S.
- Died: April 8, 2024 (aged 97); Columbus, Georgia, U.S.
- Spouse: Jeannie Puckett (m. 1953)
- Military career
- Allegiance: United States
- Branch: United States Army
- Service years: 1943–1945, 1949–1971
- Rank: Colonel
- Commands: 2nd Battalion, 502nd Infantry (Airborne); Mountain Ranger Division of the Ranger Department; Eighth Army Ranger Company
- Conflicts: World War II; Korean War; Vietnam War
- Awards: Medal of Honor; Distinguished Service Cross; Silver Star (2); Legion of Merit (3); Bronze Star Medal (2); Purple Heart (5); Air Medal (10); Army Commendation Medal; Taegeuk - Order of Military Merit
- Other work: Outward Bound, Inc. (1971–1986)

Ralph Puckett Jr. (December 8, 1926 – April 8, 2024) was a United States Army officer. He led the Eighth Army Ranger Company during the Korean War and was awarded the Distinguished Service Cross for his actions on November 25, 1950, when his company of 51 Rangers was attacked by several hundred Chinese soldiers at the battle for Hill 205. He later served in the Vietnam War and retired from the army in 1971 as a colonel. After being appointed on July 19, 1996, he served as the Honorary Colonel of the 75th Ranger Regiment.

In April 2021, Puckett's Distinguished Service Cross for his actions on November 25, 1950, was upgraded to the Medal of Honor. He received the award from President Joe Biden during a ceremony at the White House on May 21, 2021. Until his death in 2024, Puckett was the last surviving Medal of Honor recipient of the Korean War, until navy pilot Royce Williams received the award in February 2026.

== Early life ==
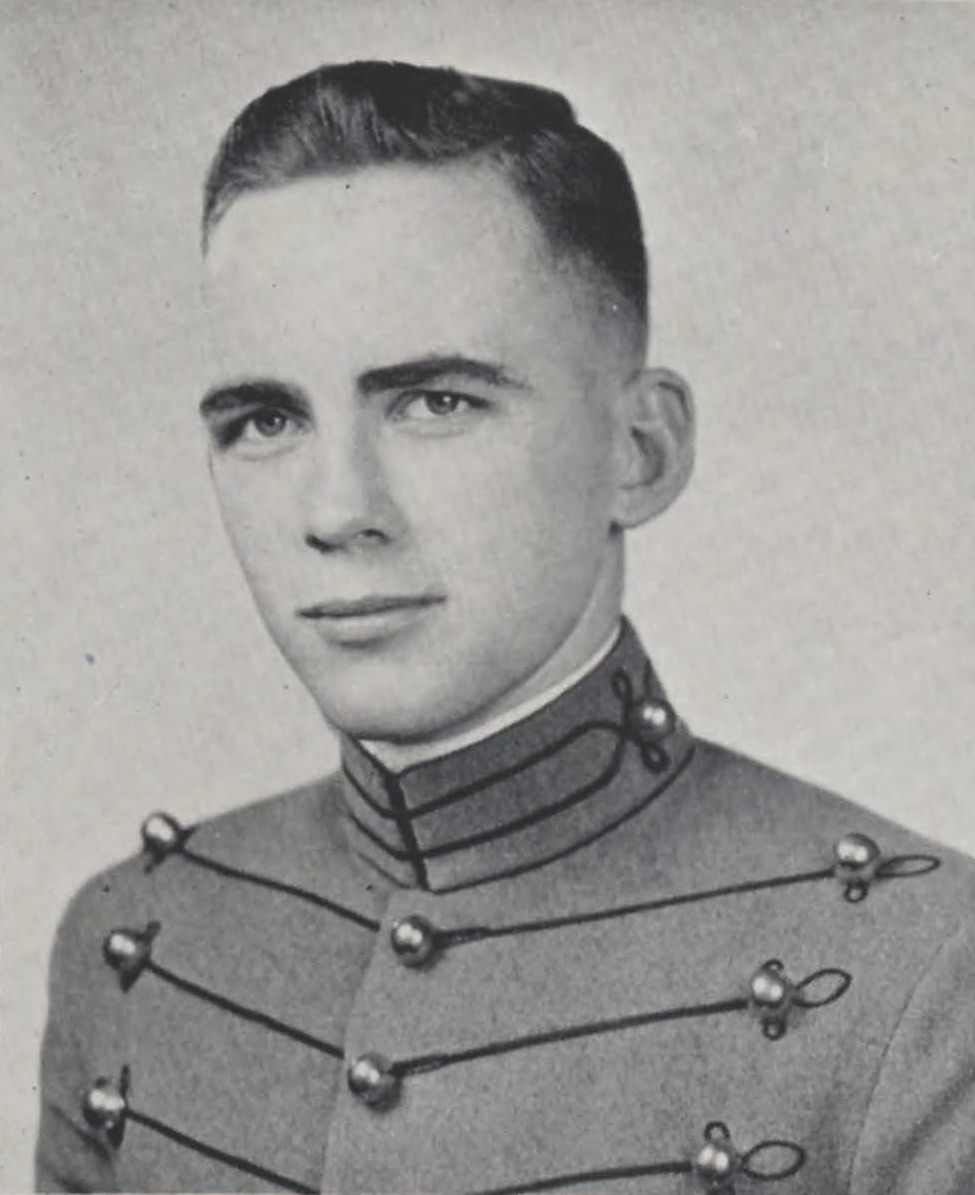
Puckett Jr. as a West Point Cadet c. 1949

Puckett was born on December 8, 1926, in Tifton, Georgia. He grew up in Tifton, which is in South Georgia. He attended Tifton High School, then finished high school at Baylor School, at that time a military academy, in Chattanooga, Tennessee. He enrolled at Georgia Tech in 1943 before enlisting in the U.S. Army during World War II. In 1943, he became an Eagle Scout.

== Military career ==
Puckett enlisted in the U.S. Army Air Corps Enlisted Reserve in 1943 to become a pilot, undertaking his pre-aviation cadet training at Georgia Tech. However, with a glut of trained pilots, the program was disbanded. Puckett tried to remain in service with the Air Corps, but after it became clear there would be no chance at flight training, he chose to be discharged. He obtained an appointment to the United States Military Academy in July 1945.

In 1949, Puckett graduated from the United States Military Academy (where he captained the Army Boxing Team), was commissioned as an infantry second lieutenant, deployed to Japan, and immediately volunteered to be assigned with the Rangers. When he was informed that there were no more lieutenant positions in the Eighth Army Ranger Company, he said that he would "take a squad leader's or rifleman's job"; positions several grades lower than a lieutenant's. Colonel McGee, who was in charge of forming the company, was so impressed by Puckett's attitude that he gave him the company commander's position; a position normally reserved for captains. On October 11, 1950, the Eighth Army Ranger Company entered the Korean War, conducting raids during both daylight and night time conditions.

=== Hill 205 ===
On November 25, 1950, Puckett and his company captured Hill 205, a strategic point overlooking the Chongchon River, as part of the Battle of the Ch'ongch'on River. Puckett led the Rangers during the attack, shouted words of encouragement and got supporting fire from the closest tank. When a platoon was pinned down, he ran across an open area three times to draw enemy fire, which allowed the Rangers to locate and destroy the enemy positions and to seize Hill 205. After capturing the hill, the Ranger company was over a mile from the nearest friendly unit. Puckett coordinated artillery support prior to the Chinese counterattack.

At 10pm, the Chinese began their attack by firing a mortar salvo against the Rangers. Six waves of Chinese forces assaulted the hill, with the first five waves attacking the hill for four hours. The Rangers were outnumbered 10-to-1. Several times, Puckett was forced to call in "danger close" artillery fire. During the sixth assault, the Rangers were overrun in hand-to-hand combat. There was a lack of artillery support due to Chinese attacks throughout the American lines. Puckett, who had previously suffered a thigh wound, incurred several wounds to his feet, buttocks, and an arm when two mortars landed in his fox hole. After his wounds immobilized him, Puckett ordered his Rangers to leave him behind and abandon the position. Two of the Rangers, David Pollock and Billy Walls, ignored his orders, shot three Chinese soldiers who were yards from Puckett's fox hole, and evacuated Puckett from the hill. After he was evacuated, Puckett was able to call for artillery fire to hit the hill. He was hospitalized for 11 months due to the wounds he suffered that night.

Puckett was initially awarded a Distinguished Service Cross before it was upgraded to a Medal of Honor in 2021. Pollock and Walls received the Silver Star for gallantry.

=== After Korea ===
Following the Korean War, Puckett served over two years in the U.S. Army Infantry School Ranger Department as commander of the Mountain Ranger Division. As the first Ranger Advisor in the U.S. Army Mission to Colombia, he planned and established the Colombian Army Escuela de Lanceros (Ranger School). Later, he commanded "B" and "C" teams in the 10th Special Forces Group in Germany. In 1967, Puckett, then a Lieutenant Colonel, commanded the 2nd Battalion, 502nd Infantry Regiment (United States) of the 101st Airborne Division in Vietnam. He was awarded a second Distinguished Service Cross for heroic leadership in August 1967. During a firefight near Đức Phổ, South Vietnam, he exposed himself to intense enemy fire and rallied his undermanned unit to defeat Viet Cong forces.

== Retirement ==
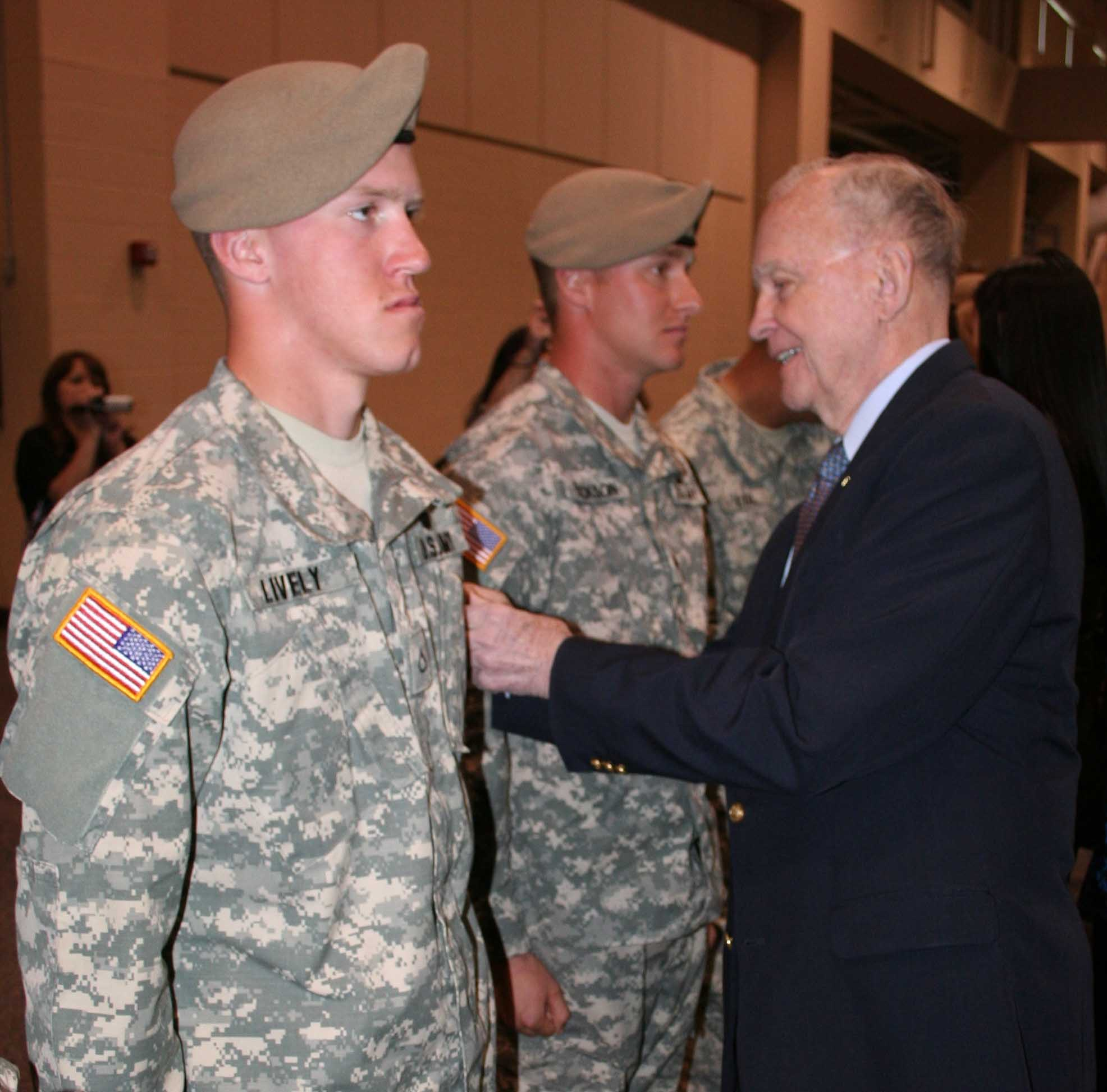
Puckett with Army Rangers in 2010.

Puckett retired in 1971 after 22 years of active duty to become the national programs coordinator of Outward Bound, Inc. He subsequently established leadership and teamwork development program Discovery, Inc. After several years of successful leadership at Discovery, Inc. in Herndon, Virginia, Puckett moved to Atlanta and began the Discovery Program at The Westminster Schools. In 1984, he became the executive vice-president of MicroBilt, Inc., a soft- and hardware computer company. Puckett was an inaugural inductee into the U.S. Army Ranger Hall of Fame in 1992. He served as the Honorary Colonel for the 75th Ranger Regiment from 1996 to 2006 for which he was awarded the Distinguished Civilian Service Award. He often spoke at graduations and other functions at Fort Benning and was an Honorary Instructor at The Infantry School. He was inducted into the Order of St. Maurice in 1997, and was the 1998 Ranger of the Year for the Ranger Infantry Companies of the Korean War. He was inducted into the USAF Gathering of Eagles in 1999. He was added to the Tifton, Georgia, Wall of Fame in 2004. Other honors include appointment as an Ambassador of Goodwill by the Western Hemisphere Institute for Security Cooperation, selection as a Distinguished Graduate of the United States Military Academy in 2004, and selection as the Infantry's Doughboy Award recipient in 2007. He was the author of Words for Warriors: A Professional Soldier's Notebook and numerous media articles.

== Personal life and death ==
Puckett and his wife had two daughters and a son, six grandchildren and four great-grandchildren. One of his daughters preceded him in death.

Puckett died on April 8, 2024, at his home in Columbus, Georgia, at the age of 97.

== Awards and decorations ==

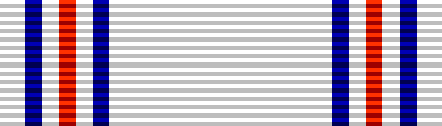

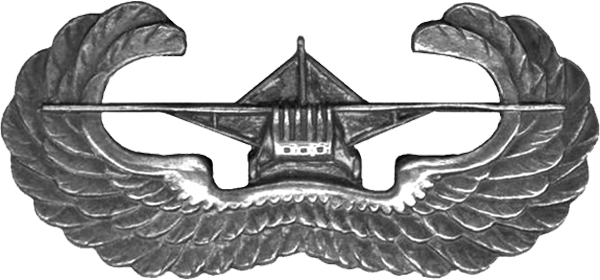

Badge	Combat Infantryman Badge with 1 star (2nd award)		
1st row	Medal of Honor; Upgraded from the DSC awarded for his actions at Hill 205	Distinguished Service Cross	Silver Star with Oak leaf cluster
2nd row	Legion of Merit with 2 oak leaf clusters	Bronze Star Medal with Valor device and Oak leaf cluster	Purple Heart with 4 oak leaf clusters
3rd row	Air Medal with 9 oak leaf clusters	Army Commendation Medal	Army Distinguished Public Service Medal
4th row	American Campaign Medal	World War II Victory Medal	National Defense Service Medal with 1 oak leaf cluster
5th row	Korean Service Medal with three bronze Campaign stars	Vietnam Service Medal with three Campaign stars	Vietnam Gallantry Cross with Palm
6th row	Vietnam Civil Actions Medal; First Class	Knight of the Order of Military Merit José María Córdova (Colombia)	Taegeuk Order of Military Merit (South Korea)
7th row	United Nations Korea Medal	Vietnam Campaign Medal	Korean War Service Medal
Badges	Master Parachutist Badge		Glider Badge
Badges	Special Forces Tab		Ranger Tab
Unit awards	Republic of Korea Presidential Unit Citation		Vietnam Unit Gallantry Cross with Palm
Foreign badges	Lancero Badge (Colombia)		
Civilian Awards	United States Special Operations Command Medal		

=== Medal of Honor citation ===
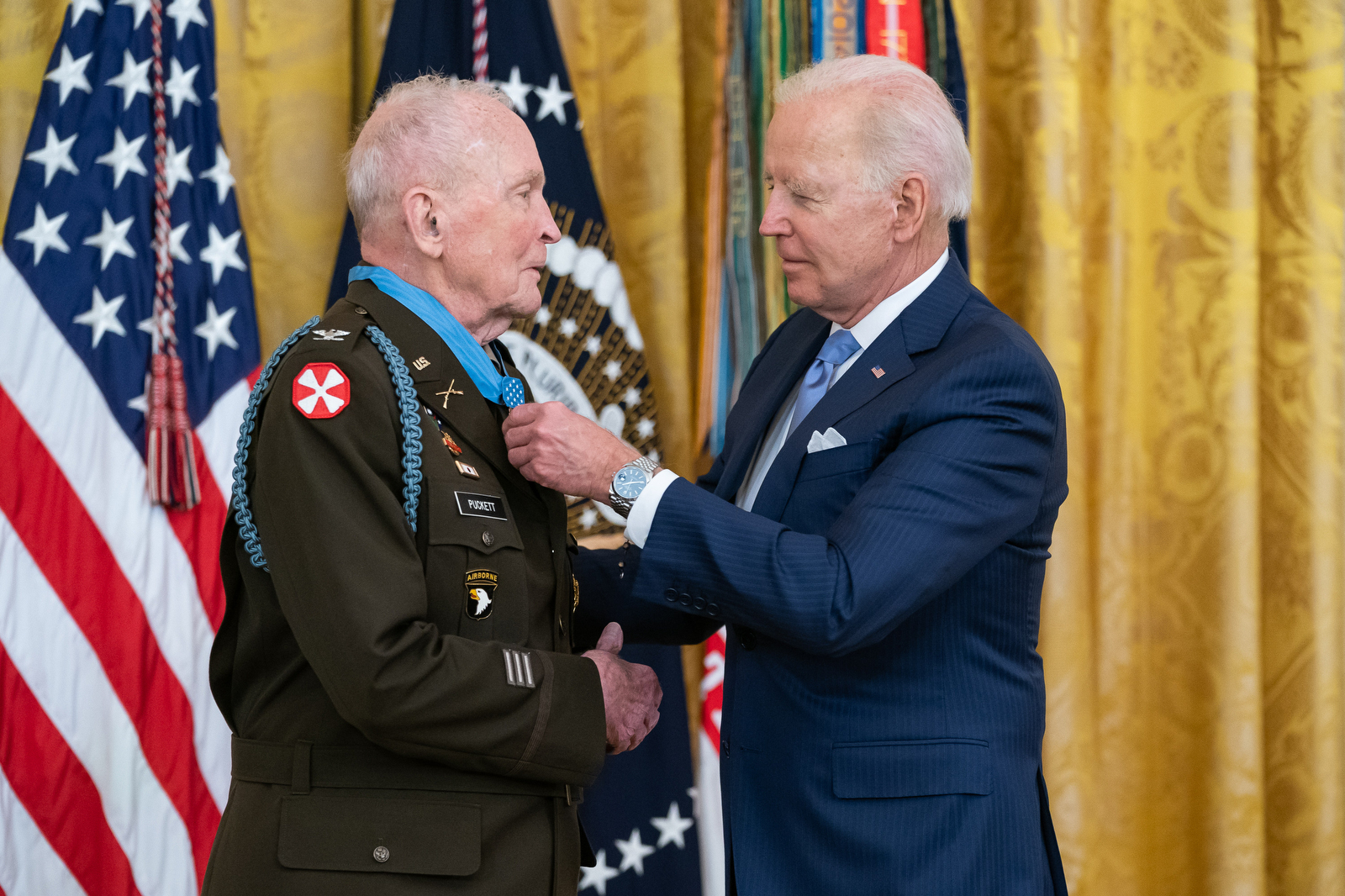
Puckett being awarded the Medal of Honor by President Joe Biden in 2021.

OFFICIAL CITATION

The President of the United States of America, authorized by Act of Congress, March 3rd, 1863, has awarded, in the name of Congress, the Medal of Honor to

FIRST LIEUTENANT RALPH PUCKETT, JR. UNITED STATES ARMY for conspicuous gallantry and intrepidity at the risk of his life above and beyond the call of duty.

First Lieutenant Ralph Puckett, Jr., distinguished himself by acts of gallantry and intrepidity above and beyond the call of duty while serving as the commander 8th U.S. Army Ranger Company during the period of 25 November 1950, through 26 November 1950, in Korea.

As his unit commenced a daylight attack on Hill 205, the enemy directed mortar, machine gun, and small-arms fire against the advancing force. To obtain fire, First Lieutenant Puckett mounted the closest tank, exposing himself to the deadly enemy fire. Leaping from the tank, he shouted words of encouragement to his men and began to lead the Rangers in the attack.

Almost immediately, enemy fire threatened the success of the attack by pinning down one platoon. Leaving the safety of his position, with full knowledge of the danger, First Lieutenant Puckett intentionally ran across an open area three times to draw enemy fire, thereby allowing the Rangers to locate and destroy the enemy positions and to seize Hill 205.

During the night, the enemy launched a counterattack that lasted four hours. Over the course of the counterattack, the Rangers were inspired and motivated by the extraordinary leadership and courageous example exhibited by First Lieutenant Puckett. As a result, five human-wave attacks by a battalion-strength enemy — enemy element were repulsed.

During the first attack, First Lieutenant Puckett was wounded by grenade fragments, but refused evacuation and continually directed artillery support that decimated attacking enemy formations.

He repeatedly abandoned positions of relative safety to make his way from foxhole to foxhole, to check the company’s perimeter and to distribute ammunition amongst the Rangers.

When the enemy launched a sixth attack, it became clear to First Lieutenant Puckett that the position was untenable due to the unavailability of supporting artillery fire. During this attack, two enemy mortar rounds landed in his foxhole, inflicting grievous wounds, which limited his mobility.

Knowing his men were in a precarious situation, First Lieutenant Puckett commanded the Rangers to leave him behind and evacuate the area. Feeling a sense of duty to aid him, the Rangers refused the order and staged an effort to retrieve him from the foxhole while still under fire from the enemy.

Ultimately, the Rangers succeeded in retrieving First Lieutenant Puckett and they moved to the bottom of the hill, where First Lieutenant Puckett called for devastating artillery fire on the top of the enemy-controlled hill.

First Lieutenant Puckett’s extraordinary heroism and selflessness above and beyond the call of duty were in keeping with the highest traditions of military service and reflect great credit upon himself, his unit, and the United States Army.

— Colonel (Ret.) Ralph Puckett Jr. | Medal of Honor Recipient | U.S. Army

=== Other awards ===
- Order of Saint Maurice (Primicerius)
- Colombian Lancero Ranger Badge

=== Legacy ===
- Colonel Ralph Puckett Parkway, a stretch of First Division and Dixie roads running from the end of I-185 to Sightseeing Road on Fort Benning, was dedicated on June 8, 2012.
- Colonel Puckett is the namesake of the Colonel Ralph Puckett Leadership Award series.

The first award is a competition to identify a junior officer in the Ranger Regiment who sticks out amongst his peers for his take-charge attitude. The contest extends over three days and nights and consists of several different physical fitness tests, weapons firing, military skills, essay preparation, and appearance before a board of officers and senior non-commissioned officers. The winner of the award is considered by the Regiment as the entry in the Army-wide MacArthur Award competition.
The second award is presented to the Officer Honor Graduate at the U.S. Army Ranger Course. The recipient of this award performs successfully in each leadership position, completes the demanding Ranger Course without repeating any phase, and was acclaimed by his peers.
The third award is presented to an officer in the Maneuver Captains Career Course who displayed exceptional leadership and exhibits exemplary physical condition, consistent high academic standing, and served in a leadership position.

- On November 25, 2025, a statue was unveiled on Hurley Hill at Fort Benning. The seven-foot-tall, bronze statue prominently overlooks an area where newly qualified Rangers, and their families, will pass and remember who he was and the Ranger legacy he represents. Puckett preferred this relatively remote location because he often frequented that location to inspire new trainees at the beginning of each Ranger Course.
- Another statue, depicting Puckett as a young lieutenant during the Korean War, is located at the National Infantry Museum’s Korean War Memorial.
