= Willys M38 =

Type of 1 4-short-ton (230 kg) 4x4 truck

Willys MC / M38
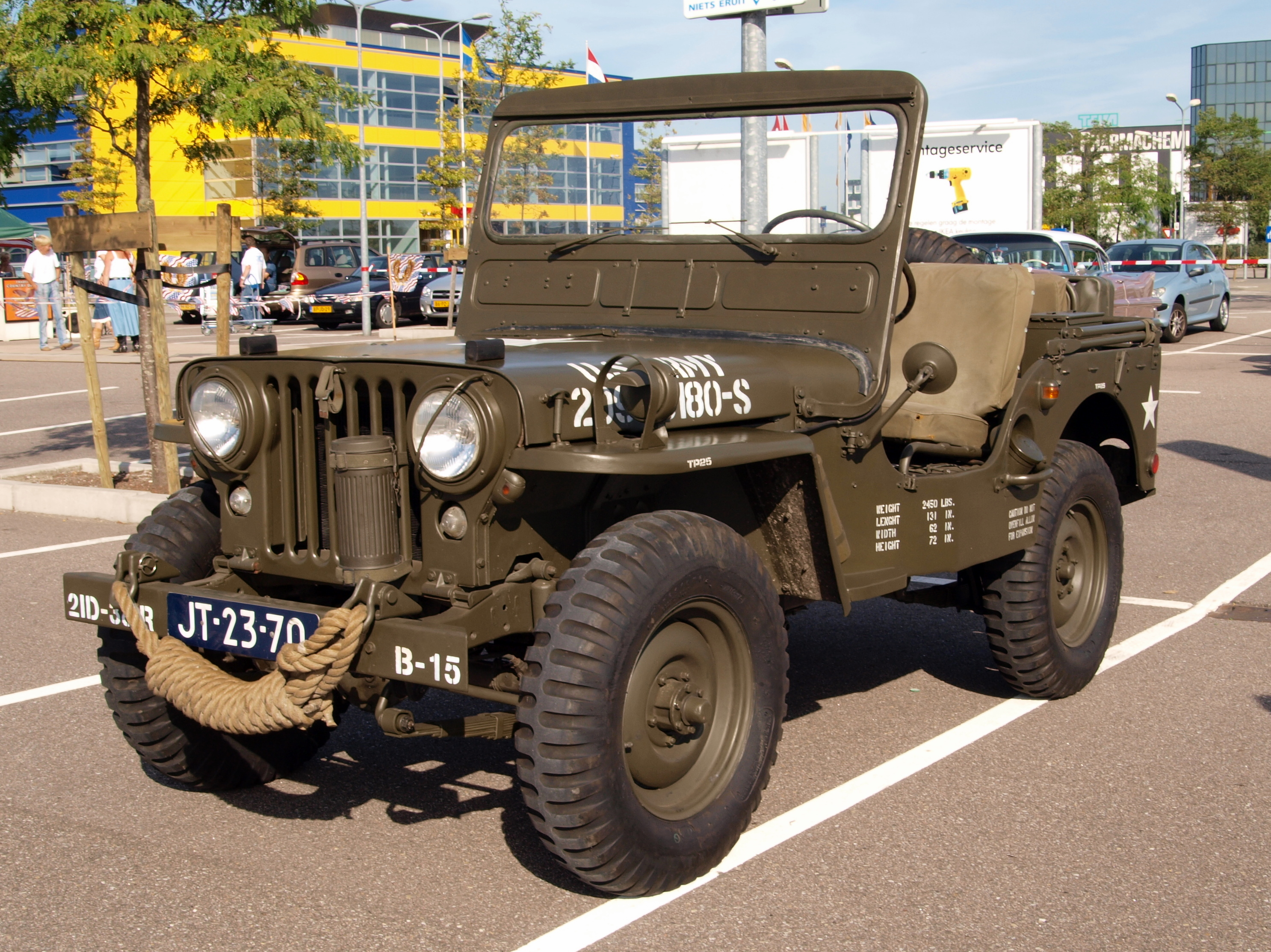
- A restored Willys M38
- Type: Quarter-ton (Note: Nominal off-road payload rating — real payload rating was over 500 kg (1,100 lb) on road; and off-road 3/8 of a ton.) 4x4 utility truck
- Place of origin: United States

Service history
- Wars: Korean War; Vietnam War; Laotian Civil War; Lebanese Civil War other conflicts

Production history
- Manufacturer: Willys-Overland
- Produced: 1949–1952
- No. built: more than 45,473 produced

Specifications
- Mass: 2,625 lb (1,191 kg) Empty
- Length: 133 in (3.38 m)
- Width: 62 in (1.57 m)
- Height: 69 3/4 in (1.77 m)
- Engine: Willys MC; 60 hp (45 kW)
- Transmission: 3 spd. x 2 range trf. case
- Suspension: Beam axles on leaf springs
- Fuel capacity: 13 US gal (49 L)
- Operational range: 220 mi (354.1 km)
- Maximum speed: 60 mph (97 km/h)

The Willys MC, formally the 1/4-Ton, 4 x 4, Utility Truck M38, or the G‑740 by its U.S. Army Standard Nomenclature supply catalog designation, is a quarter-ton four-wheel drive military light utility vehicle made by Willys between 1949 and 1952. It replaced (in production), and succeeded the World War II Willys MB and Ford GPW models, with a total production of some 50,000 units—less than one-tenth the number of WWII models built.

The M38 was a military version of the then-current civilian Jeep CJ-3A. It differed from the CJ-3A in numerous ways, including a reinforced frame and suspension, waterproof 24-volt electrical system, sealed vent system for the engine, transmission, transfer case, fuel system and brake system.

Some M38 jeeps served in the Korean theatre of operations, but the majority of units used there were remanufactured World War II jeeps. Approximately 2,300 M38 Jeeps were manufactured by Ford of Canada for the Canadian Armed Forces in 1952, designated as the M38-CDN jeep. The M38 Willys MC was succeeded by the M38A1 Willys MD in 1952.

The M38 windshield could be folded flat for firing, and the body was equipped with a pintle hook for towing and lifting shackles front and rear. The headlights were no longer recessed as on previous models, but protruded with a guard wire in front. The "pioneer" tools (axe and shovel), which were carried on the MB's driver side, were transferred to the passenger side of this vehicle.

== Specifications ==
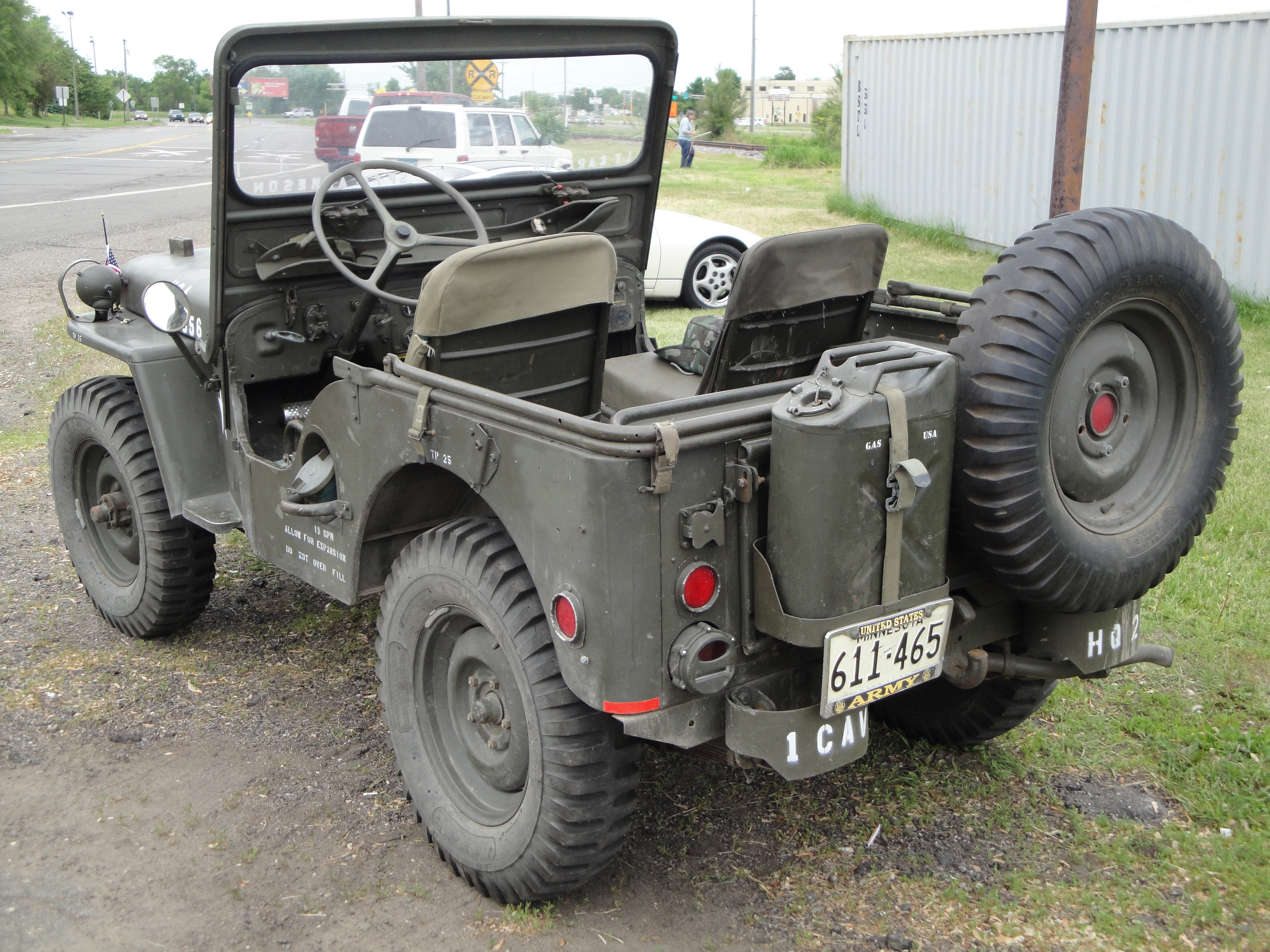
Rear of M38 jeep

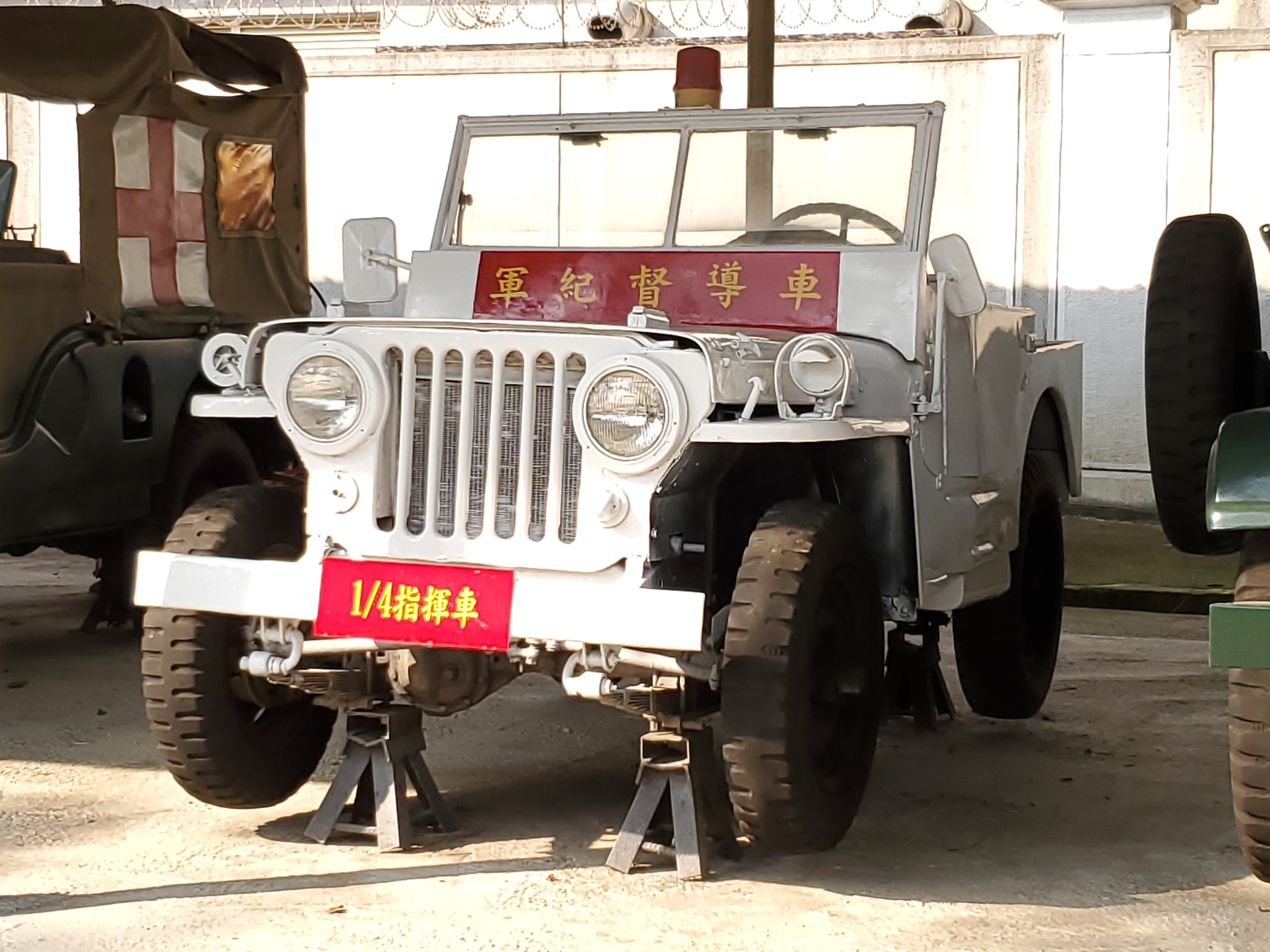
Military Police Willys M38 of the Taiwanese marines

- Wheelbase: 80 in (2.03 m)
- Length overall: 132 15/16 in (3.38 m)
- Width, minimum: 62 in (1.57 m)
- Height overall: maximum 74 in (1.88 m) with top up; reducible to 55 in (1.40 m)
- Ground clearance: 9 1/4 in (0.23 m) at the rear axle
- Empty weight: 2,625 pounds (1,191 kg)
- Gross vehicle weight: 3,825 pounds (1,735 kg) on road
- Payload: 1,200 pounds (544 kg) on road / 800 pounds (363 kg) off-road.

== Engine ==
- Displacement: 134.2 cubic inches (2,199 cc)
- Bore/Stroke: 3 1/8 in × 4 3/8 in (79 mm × 111 mm)
- Compression Ratio: 6.48:1
- Power: 60 hp (45 kW) at 4000 rpm
- Torque: 105 lb⋅ft (142 N⋅m) at 2000 rpm
- Main Bearings: 3
- Carburetor: Carter YS 637S, 1 1/4 in (32 mm) downdraft

== Powertrain ==
The entire engine air intake and the axle system were fully vented to allow for operation while submerged under water. Its full-floating front axle (Dana 25) was supported by the wheel hub, rather than the axle itself, and provided greater load capacity. The rear axle (Dana 44) was semi-floating. Its drivetrain was the L-head 134.2 cu in (2.2 L) with a T-90 transmission and the Dana 18 transfer case.

A few M38 Jeeps were fitted with a transmission power take-off (PTO) driven winch. This feature was not used in regular production models due to increased weight on the front of the vehicle, as well as additional maintenance requirements.

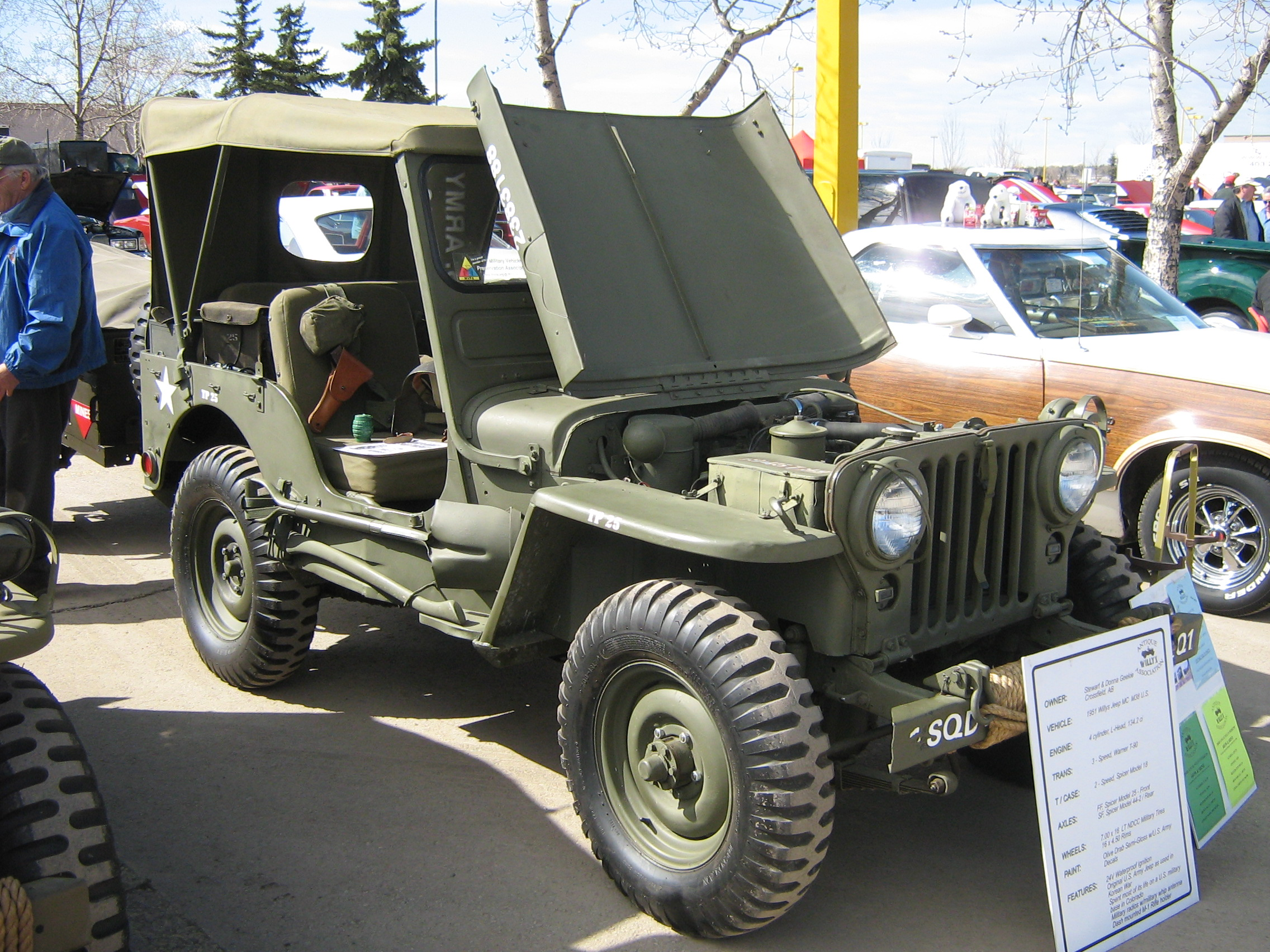
M38 with hood and top up

== Electrical system ==
The electrical system was upgraded to a 24-volt system, which required dual 12-volt batteries connected in series. Its ignition and electrical systems were waterproof; a valuable feature in rainy environments and where deep river fording was necessary.

== Operators ==
=== Former operators ===
- Canada
- Greece
- Indonesia
- South Korea, used by the South Korean police as patrol vehicles during the 1950s.
- Taiwan
- United States

== See also ==
- List of U.S. military vehicles by supply catalog designation
- List of U.S. military vehicles by model number
- Jeep trailer (M100)
