= Operations (military staff) =

Military staff involved in planning operations

Military operations is a concept and application of military science that involves planning the operations for the projected maneuvering forces' provisions, services, training, and administrative functions—to allow them to commence, insert, then egress from combat. The operations staff plays a major role in the projection of military forces in any wide spectrum of conflict; terrestrial, aerial, or naval warfare needed to achieve operational objectives in a theater of war.

The general staff of military operations deals with the planning, process, collection, and analyzing of information. Its major function is responsible in the allocating of resources and determining time requirements. It is combined with other military staff sections to achieve its primary principles in employment of military forces and materiel to meet specific missions.

The operations staff have distinct cyclic process features that are essential for military operations to progress:

- Conception through identification of specific goals or objectives
- Intelligence gathering and analysis to identify enemy capability to resist
- Planning of military force and its use
- Administration of mobilization, equipping, training and staging of forces
- Commencement of the operation, and achieving of initial tactical mission objectives
- Defeating the larger enemy forces in their operational depth
- Ending the operation whether the strategic goals have been achieved or not

== General staff ==
=== United States ===
The general staff of operations designation is "3" to its corresponding section—e.g. J-3 (Joint (Multi-Service) Military Operations), G-3/S-3 (Army and Marine Corps staffs use both, depending on the organizational size and structure), N-3 (Navy), and A-3 (Air Force). From 1941 to 1945 the US Marine Corps used D-3 to designate the operations staff for its division level units.
