= Land navigation =

Navigation through unfamiliar terrain

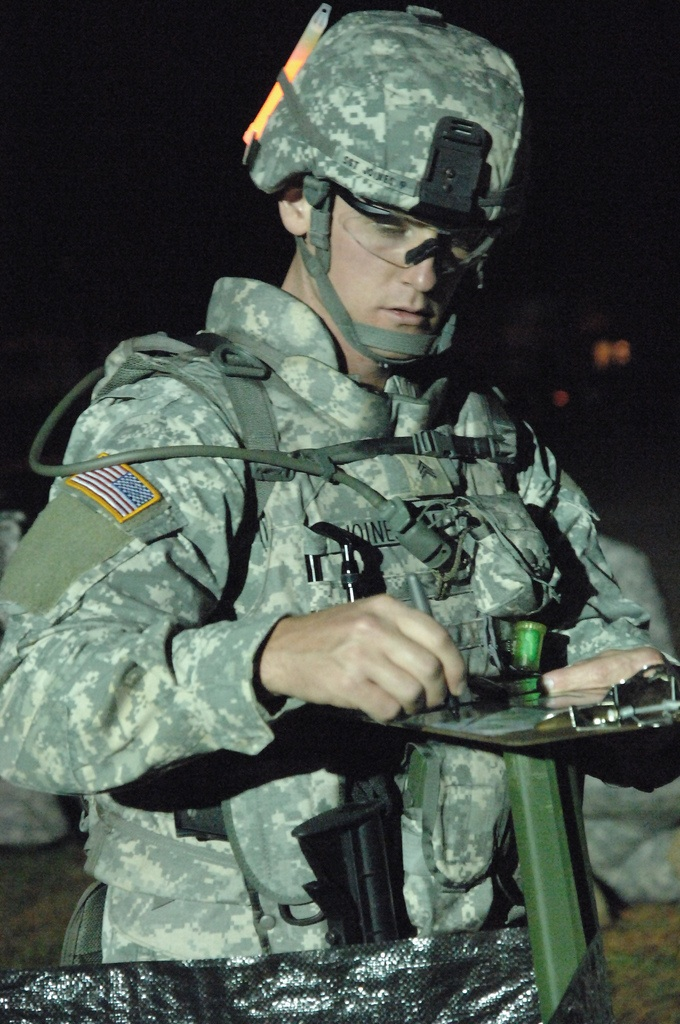
One of 24 competitors at the night urban warfare orienteering course during the 2009 Department of the Army Best Warrior Competition at Fort Lee, Virginia

Land navigation is the discipline of following a route through unfamiliar terrain on foot or by vehicle, using maps with reference to terrain, a compass, and other navigational tools. It is distinguished from travel by traditional groups, such as the Tuareg across the Sahara and the Inuit across the Arctic, who use subtle cues to travel across familiar, yet minimally differentiated terrain.

Land navigation is a core military discipline, which uses courses or routes that are an essential part of military training. Often, these courses are several miles long in rough terrain and are performed under adverse conditions, such as at night or in the rain.

In the late 19th century, land navigation developed into the sport of orienteering. The earliest use of the term 'orienteering' appears to be in 1886. Nordic military garrisons began orienteering competitions in 1895.

== Mathematical basis ==
Land navigation commonly represents position on a map using a local rectangular coordinate system, such as a grid printed on a topographic map. A movement from a known point can be described by a distance and an azimuth; this is equivalent to using polar coordinates. If an azimuth $\theta$ is measured clockwise from north and the distance traveled is $d$, the corresponding east and north components of displacement are

$$\Delta E = d\sin\theta, \qquad \Delta N = d\cos\theta$$

In field use, these are calculated graphically by plotting an azimuth line on the map with a protractor and measuring distance using the map scale. Distance traveled on foot may be estimated by pace count, while position may also be estimated or checked by plotting lines of position.

== United States ==
In the United States military, land navigation courses are required for the Marine Corps and the Army. Air Force escape and evasion training includes aspects of land navigation. Army Training Circular 3-25.26 is devoted to land navigation.

== See also ==
- History of orienteering
- Navigation
- Piloting
- Wayfinding
