= 187th Infantry Regiment (United States) =

187th Airborne Infantry Regiment
- Coat of arms
- Founded: 1943
- Country: United States
- Branch: United States Army
- Type: Regiment
- Part of: 101st Airborne Division
- Garrison/HQ: Fort Campbell, Kentucky, U.S.
- Nicknames: Rakkasans (English: Parachutes, lit. 'umbrellas for falling')
- Motto: Ne Desit Virtus (English: Let valor not fail)
- Engagements: World War II; Cold War; Korean War; Vietnam War; 1958 Lebanon crisis; Persian Gulf War; Operation Desert Storm; Operation Desert Focus; Global War on Terrorism; War in Afghanistan; Operation Anaconda; Iraq War; Operation Iraqi Freedom
- Decorations: Presidential Unit Citation; Valorous Unit Award; Meritorious Unit Commendation; Philippine Republic Presidential Unit Citation; Republic of Korea Presidential Unit Citation

Commanders
- Notable commanders: Frank S. Bowen Jr. Thomas J. H. Trapnell; William C. Westmoreland; Roy E. Lindquist

Insignia
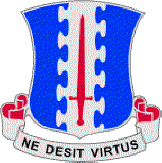
- Distinctive unit insignia

- Airborne background trimming for 1st and 3rd Battalions

- Beret flashes for 1st and 3rd battalions, currently being worn on the Army Black Beret

The 187th Airborne Infantry Regiment (Rakkasans) is a regiment of the 101st Airborne Division. (Note: The nickname "Rakkasans" is derived from the Japanese word for parachute (literally "umbrella for falling", 落下傘). The name was given to the 187th during its tour in occupied Japan following World War II. When a translator dealing with local Japanese dignitaries was trying to explain what their unit was trained to do, (and not knowing the Japanese word for "airborne soldiers") he used the phrase "parachute-men" (literally "falling down umbrella men"), or rakkasan. Amused by the clumsy word, the locals began to call the troopers by that nickname; it soon stuck and became a point of pride for the unit. (Note that modern Japanese uses the English loanword パラシュート (parashūto) for parachute.))

As of 2012, the 1st and 3rd battalions are the only active elements of the regiment; they are assigned to the 3rd Brigade Combat Team, 101st Airborne Division.

== Military operations ==
=== World War II and aftermath ===
The regiment was originally constituted as the 187th Glider Infantry Regiment on 12 November 1942, and activated on 23 February 1943 at Camp Mackall, North Carolina. It was originally a two battalion glider regiment assigned to the 11th Airborne Division, the men of the 187th trained both as glider and parachute troops. They moved to Camp Polk on 9 January 1944 for glider training. The regiment staged at Camp Stoneman, California on 29 April 1944, and departed from the San Francisco Port of Embarkation on 6 May 1944.

The regiment arrived in New Guinea on 29 May 1944 and joined the New Guinea Campaign. The regiment departed New Guinea on 11 November 1944, and arrived on Leyte on 18 November 1944 to join the Leyte Campaign.

The regiment left Leyte, and joined the Luzon Campaign by assaulting Nasugbu Point Luzon on 31 January 1945, blocking Japanese forces as part of the advance on Manila from the south. From then until April 1945, the 187th fought their way from Nichols Field, Fort William McKinley, and Manila to Mount Macolod and Malepunyo.

In May 1945, the 187th moved into Lipa to refit, rebuild, and prepare for Operation Downfall, the planned invasion of Japan. At this time, the 3rd Battalion was formed and the regiment was redesignated a para-glider regiment.

The regiment was attached to the Provost Marshal General, U.S. Army Forces Far East from 1 June 1945 through 27 July 1945 at Manila. The campaigns in the Philippines were declared completed on 4 July 1945, and the regiment moved to Okinawa on 12 August 1945 for occupation duty. This is where the unit gained its name; Rakkasan (落下傘; lit. 'falling umbrella'), which means "Parachute" in Japanese, when it was the only unit to parachute onto Japanese soil at the time. With soldiers landing in close proximity to local landmarks featuring toriis the 187th adopted the torii as an unofficial part of the unit identity. After the war ended on 14 August 1945, the regiment subsequently moved to Japan on 30 August 1945, and was alleged to be the first foreign ground combat unit to enter that nation.

In April 1949, the regiment returned to the United States and was stationed at what was then Camp Campbell, Kentucky. It was redesignated the 187th Airborne Infantry Regiment on 30 June 1949 and remained assigned to the 11th Airborne Division. In early 1950, the 187th participated in "Operation Swarmer", the largest peacetime airborne maneuver in history.

=== Korean War ===
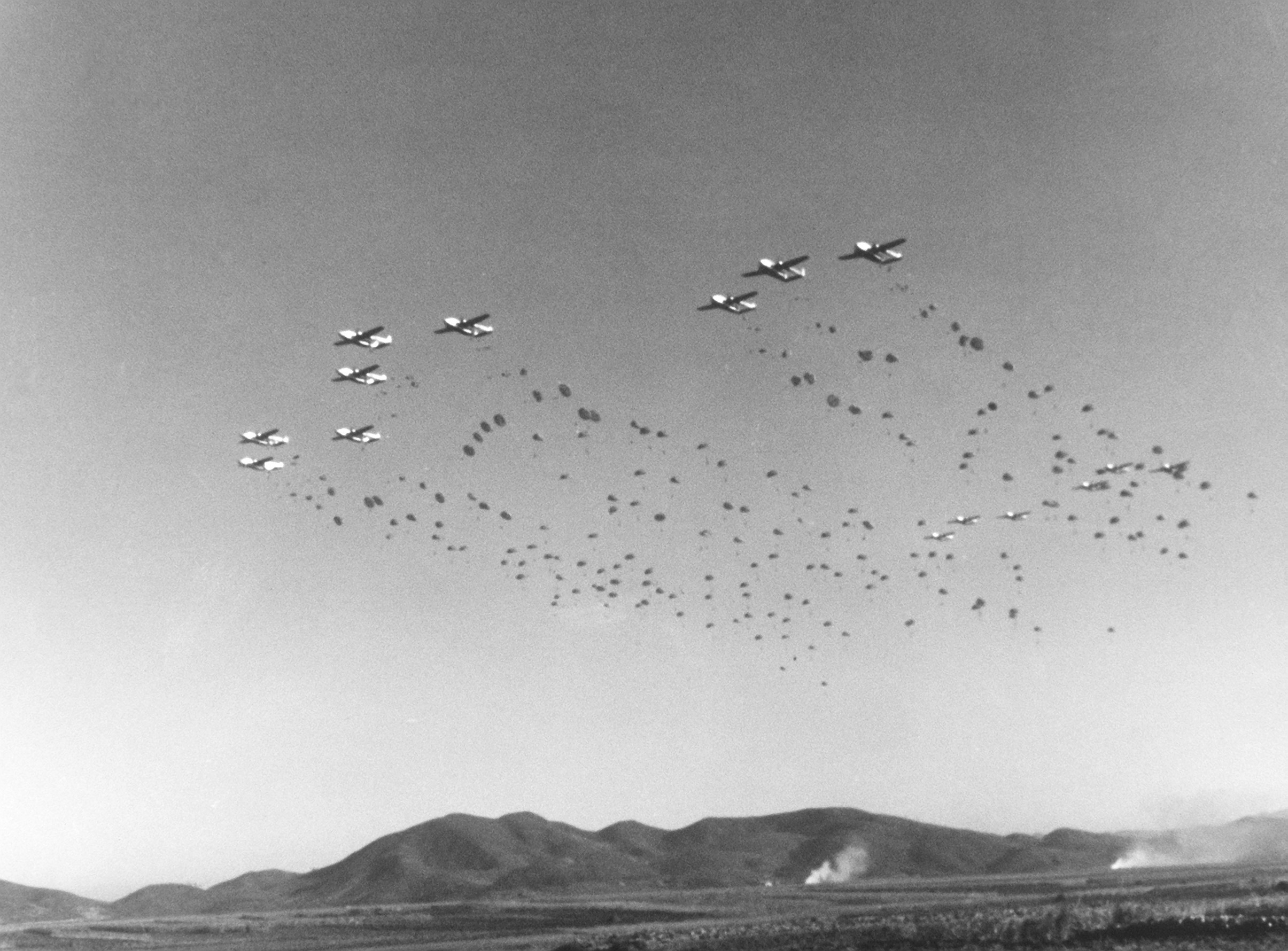
403rd TCW C-119s drop the 187th RCT over Taegu, South Korea, November 1952.

The 187th was selected as an airborne regimental combat team responding to the North Korean invasion of South Korea. On 1 August 1950 the regiment became the 187th Airborne Regimental Combat Team (ARCT) when supporting units were added and deployed to Japan, arriving on 20 September 1950. The advance party of the 3rd Battalion of the Rakkasans was the first to arrive in South Korea, arriving at Kimpo Airfield on 23 September. On 24 September, it was placed under the operational control of the First Marine Division, relieving the 2d Battalion of the 7th Marine Regiment, arriving almost a week after Douglas MacArthur's surprise landing at Inchon on 17 September 1950.

One month later, on 20 October 1950, the regiment made successful combat parachute assaults near the towns of Sukchon and Sunchon, North Korea as part of the Battle of Yongju. The published purpose of that drop was to capture members of the North Korean Government fleeing Pyongyang and also to free American POWs being moved from Pyongyang toward the Manchurian border. Neither objective was realized but were followed by battles at Suan, Wonju, Kaesong, Munsan-ni, and Inje.

The 187th led the second and last parachute assault in Korea on 23 March 1951 as part of Operation Tomahawk.

Under BG Thomas J. H. Trapnell, it redeployed to Japan on 26 June 1951 where it became a strategic reserve but returned to Korea on 24 May 1952 to assist in the suppression of the prisoner rebellion at the Geoje POW Camp where prisoners had forcibly seized and held Brigadier General Francis Dodd, camp commandant, hostage for four days from 7 May 1952. After this, it once more returned to Japan on 18 October 1952 and made its final return to Korea on 22 June 1953. From late 1952 to 1953 the 187th was commanded by Brigadier General (later General) William Westmoreland. The unit returned to the United States in July 1955 and, the following year, became part of the newly reactivated 101st Airborne Division, Fort Campbell, KY.

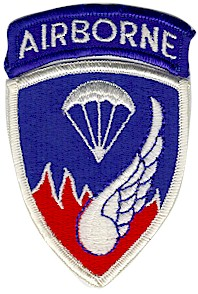
Shoulder patch for the 187th Regimental Combat Team (Airborne)

The 187th Airborne Regimental Combat Team consisted of the following units: The following units were assigned by General Order 34 (Confidential) Headquarters 11th Airborne Division:

- 187th Airborne Infantry Regiment
- 674th Airborne Field Artillery Battalion (105mm)
- Battery "A", 88th Airborne Antiaircraft Artillery Battalion
- Company "A", 127th Airborne Engineer Battalion

The following units were added on 23 August 1950 by General Order 41, 11th Airborne Division dated 22 August 1950:

- Detachment, 11th Airborne Military Police Company
- Detachment, 11th Airborne Quartermaster Company
- Parachute Maintenance Company
- Pathfinders from 11th Airborne Division

The following units were attached on 26 August 1950 per General Order 42, Headquarters 11th Airborne Division dated 25 August 1950:

- Platoon, Ambulance Company, 11th Airborne Medical Battalion
- Platoon, Clearing Company, 11th Airborne Medical Battalion

On 28 August 1950, Operations Order Number 1, IX Corps, the 2348th Quartermaster Air Packaging and Resupply Company was attached to the command of Colonel Bowen

Attached units

- 2d and 4th Ranger Infantry companies (Airborne) (3 March 1951 – 4 April 1951)
- 5-man FECOM Tactical Liaison Office Team, 8177th Army Unit. (Tactical Intelligence)

Many personnel from the 511PIR in the 11th Airborne Division were transferred to the 187th ARCT to bring it up to full strength for overseas deployment.

Four members of the 187th were awarded the Medal of Honor for their actions in the Korean War: Corporal Lester Hammond, Jr.^{(KIA)}, Corporal Rodolfo P. Hernandez, Corporal Joe R. Baldonado^{(KIA)} and Private First Class Richard G. Wilson^{(KIA)}.

The 1950s and early 1960s were a turbulent time for the Rakkasans, they returned to the US in 1955, this time to Fort Bragg, North Carolina. As part of a larger realignment of the army, under the Pentomic Division concept, the Rakkasans road marched to Fort Campbell in February 1956 to serve as the nucleus of the newly reactivated 101st Airborne Division.

=== Post-Korean War and Air Mobility ===
When the Pentomic concept that replaced regiments and battalions with battle groups was introduced in 1957, Companies A, B, and C of the 187th Airborne Infantry Regiment were redesignated as HHCs of the 1st, 2d, and 3d Airborne Battle Groups, 187th Infantry, respectively. The 1st ABG, 187th Infantry was assigned to the 11th Airborne Division in Germany from 1 March 1957 to 1 July 1958, when the 11th was inactivated and reflagged as the 24th Infantry Division. During its assignment to the 24th it was involved in the Lebanon intervention. On 8 February 1959 it was relieved from the 24th, rotated back to the United States and was assigned to the 82d Airborne Division at Fort Bragg, NC. Its colors were inactivated on 25 May 1964 and concurrently consolidated with the 1st Battalion, 187th Infantry (constituted and activated 1 February 1964 at Fort Benning, Georgia, as an element of the 11th Air Assault Division, and the consolidated unit designated as the 1st Battalion, 187th Infantry, an element of the 11th Air Assault Division (Test) at Fort Benning, GA. It was inactivated on 30 June 1965 when the 11th Air Assault Division and 2d Infantry Division were combined to form the 1st Cavalry Division (Airmobile), during which time the elements of both the 11th and 2d were reflagged with new designations.

The 2d ABG, 187th Infantry remained assigned to the 101st Airborne Division and was inactivated on 1 February 1964 when the Army abandoned the Pentomic structure in favor of brigades and battalions.

The 3d ABG, 187th Infantry was not active during the Pentomic era. The colors were redesignated on 1 February 1963 as HHC, 3d Battalion, 187th Infantry, assigned to the 11th Air Assault Division (Test) at Fort Benning, GA, and activated on 7 February 1963. Over the next year, 3rd Battalion, 187th Infantry Regiment served as a test unit to help validate the Army's airmobile concept. It was relieved from the 11th on 1 February 1964 and the colors were assigned to the 101st Airborne Division at Fort Campbell, KY. There was no transfer of troops or equipment; instead, the existing 3–187th at Fort Benning was reflagged as 1–187th.

=== Vietnam War ===
The Rakkasans moved back to Fort Campbell, Kentucky in February 1964, to serve as part of the 3rd Brigade, 101st Airborne Division. In December 1967 the 3d Battalion deployed to Vietnam, alongside 1st and 2d Battalion, 506th Infantry. Over the next four years the Iron Rakkasans fought in twelve major campaigns, conducting numerous air assaults and search and destroy missions. During one such mission in March 1968 Captain Paul W. Bucha, commander of D Company, received the Medal of Honor when he crawled through a hail of fire to single-handedly destroy a machine gun bunker with grenades near Phuoc Vinh, Vietnam. When the battalion colors returned to Fort Campbell the unit had distinguished itself by earning two Valorous Unit Awards, and its third and fourth Presidential Unit Citations for the battles of Trang Bang and Dong Ap Bia Mountain (commonly known as "Hamburger Hill"). The Iron Rakkasans emerged from the Vietnam War as the country's most highly decorated airborne battalion.

Assignments in South Vietnam

Administrative Headquarters	Forward Headquarters	Arrival	Major Command
3-187th Infantry arrived in Vietnam on 16 December 1967
Phước Vĩnh	Phuoc Vinh	December 1967	3d Bde, 101st Airborne Division
	Đắk Tô	June 1968	
	Củ Chi	July 1968	
	Long Binh	October 1968	3d Bde, 101st Airborne Division (Airmobile)
Bien Hoa	Phong Dien District, Can Tho	November 1968	
	Ta Bat	July 1969	
A Shau Valley	Firebase Berchtesgaden	August 1969	
Bien Hoa	Ta Bat	September 1969	
	Phong Dien	October 1969	
	Mai Loc	November 1969	
Phong Dien	Phong Dien	December 1969	
Huế	Phu Bai	September 1970	
Camp Carroll	Camp Carroll	March 1971	
		April 1971	1st Bde, 5th Infantry Division (Mechanized)
Huế	Phu Bai	May 1971	3d Bde, 101st Airborne Division (Airmobile)
		August 1971	US Army Forces, Military Region 2
		November 1971	3d Bde, 101st Airborne Division (Airmobile)
3d Bn, 187th Infantry departed Vietnam on 10 December 1971

The 3-187th Infantry's exploits from 10 to 20 May 1969 on hill 937 in the A Shau Valley were depicted in a 1987 movie using the hill's nickname Hamburger Hill as the title. For this action the unit received the Presidential Unit Citation.

=== Post Vietnam ===
When the 101st returned from Viet Nam, most of its personnel in the rank of staff sergeant and below were discharged upon arrival at Oakland, California, or Seattle, Washington. What remained largely consisted of a command group of staff officers and senior NCOs. The division settled into buildings recently vacated by the "U.S. Army Training Center, Fort Campbell, Kentucky."

Former 3–187th Infantry Beret Flash from the 1970s

Former 2–187th Infantry Beret Flash from the 1980s

When the 101st was rebuilt, the separate 173d Airborne Brigade was inactivated and its assets used to form the 3d Brigade as an airborne unit consisting of 1–503d INF, 2–503d INF, and 3–187th INF. The partial airborne capability also extended to supporting units of the division. This lasted only until April 1974 when The Airmobile Badge (renamed Air Assault Badge later that year) was introduced.

In October 1983 the 1st, 2d, and 4th Battalions, 187th Infantry, were activated, and on 21 November 1984 a 5th Battalion was activated. The 1st and 2d Battalions were assigned to the 193rd Infantry Brigade in Panama and the 3d, 4th and 5th were assigned to the 101st Airborne Division (Air Assault) at Fort Campbell. The 4th and 5th were created by reflagging the existing 1–503d and 2–503d, the colors of which were soon reactivated in Korea within the 2nd Infantry Division (United States). The Panama-based 2–187th included one airborne company (Moatengators) within the battalion, and later jump status was expanded to the entire battalion. 2-187th was the last airborne battalion of the 187th. During a realignment of the United States Army's combat forces in 1987 the 1st and 2d Battalions were inactivated and the 5th and 4th Battalions were reflagged as the 1st and 2d Battalions, respectively.

From July 1984 to January, 1985, the 4th Battalion, reorganized at TF-4-187 (Rakkasan Raiders) deployed to the Sinai Desert, Egypt as the United States' contingent of the Multinational Force and Observers peacekeeping mission.

From September 1988 through March 1989, 1st Battalion reorganized as Task Force 1–187 and deployed to the Sinai Desert, Egypt as the United States' contingent of the Multinational Force and Observers peacekeeping mission.

=== Gulf War ===
In September 1990 the Rakkasans were deployed to Saudi Arabia during Operation Desert Shield. In February 1991 two companies from the 1st Battalion captured 434 Iraqi soldiers during the air assault into Objective Weber and on 25 February the Rakkasans conducted the deepest and largest air assault operation in history. Striking 155 miles (249 km) behind enemy lines into the Euphrates river valley, the assault led to the timely defeat of Iraqi forces and contributed to a total allied victory. The unit moved farther north than any other unit during Operation Desert Storm.

=== Between Gulf War and GWOT ===
From 1991 to 1993 the 3-187 was commanded by Lt. Colonel (later General) David H. Petraeus who renamed the battalion the "Iron Rakkasans" after the physical training test he created. CSM Donald Purdy was the Battalion Command Sergeant Major during this time.

In 1995 the Iron Rakkasans battalion was organized as Task Force 3-187 and deployed to the Sinai Peninsula in July 1995. The Iron Rakkasans were responsible for the southern portion of Zone C and based at South Camp, Sharm el Sheik, Egypt. During the deployment, they were instrumental in the recovery of casualties from an accident near one of the sector control centers and evacuating them to hospitals utilizing Multinational Forces Helicopters. On 23 November 1995, the 7.3 M_{w} Gulf of Aqaba earthquake hit the Sinai Peninsula. Again the Iron Rakkasans performed road recon and rescue operations throughout the peninsula. The Iron Rakkasans earned an Army Superior Unit Award for their actions during the deployment. The unit returned to the United States in January 1996.

In September 1996, elements of Raider Rakkasan (2nd Battalion), Alpha Co. "Blackhawks", Charlie Co. "Hard Rock", and Bravo Co. "Warriors", 2nd Battalion deployed to Saudi Arabia through April 1997 in support of Operation Desert Focus, providing force protection for U.S. personnel in support of U.S. air assets in Saudi Arabia relocated from Dhahran and from Riyadh to the remote Prince Sultan Air Base, Camp Eagle Town II. The move's purpose was force protection, and came in the wake of the 25 June 1996 terrorist bombing at Khobar Towers which killed 19 airmen and wounded many more. U.S. and Saudi Arabian officials agreed to split the $200 million cost of relocating more than 4,000 US troops. Some 2nd Battalion soldiers were awarded the combat infantryman's badge, the Armed Forces Expeditionary Medal, the Army Achievement Medal and the unit was awarded the Army Superior Unit Award. LTC Twomey was the battalion commander. Elements of 1/187th, deployed to Saudi, were part of Operation Desert Eagle, From Sept. to Dec. 1997.

From February 2000 through August 2000 1-187 deployed to Kosovo for peacekeeping operations as a part of Task Force Falcon in support of Operation Joint Guardian.

=== Afghanistan and Iraq ===
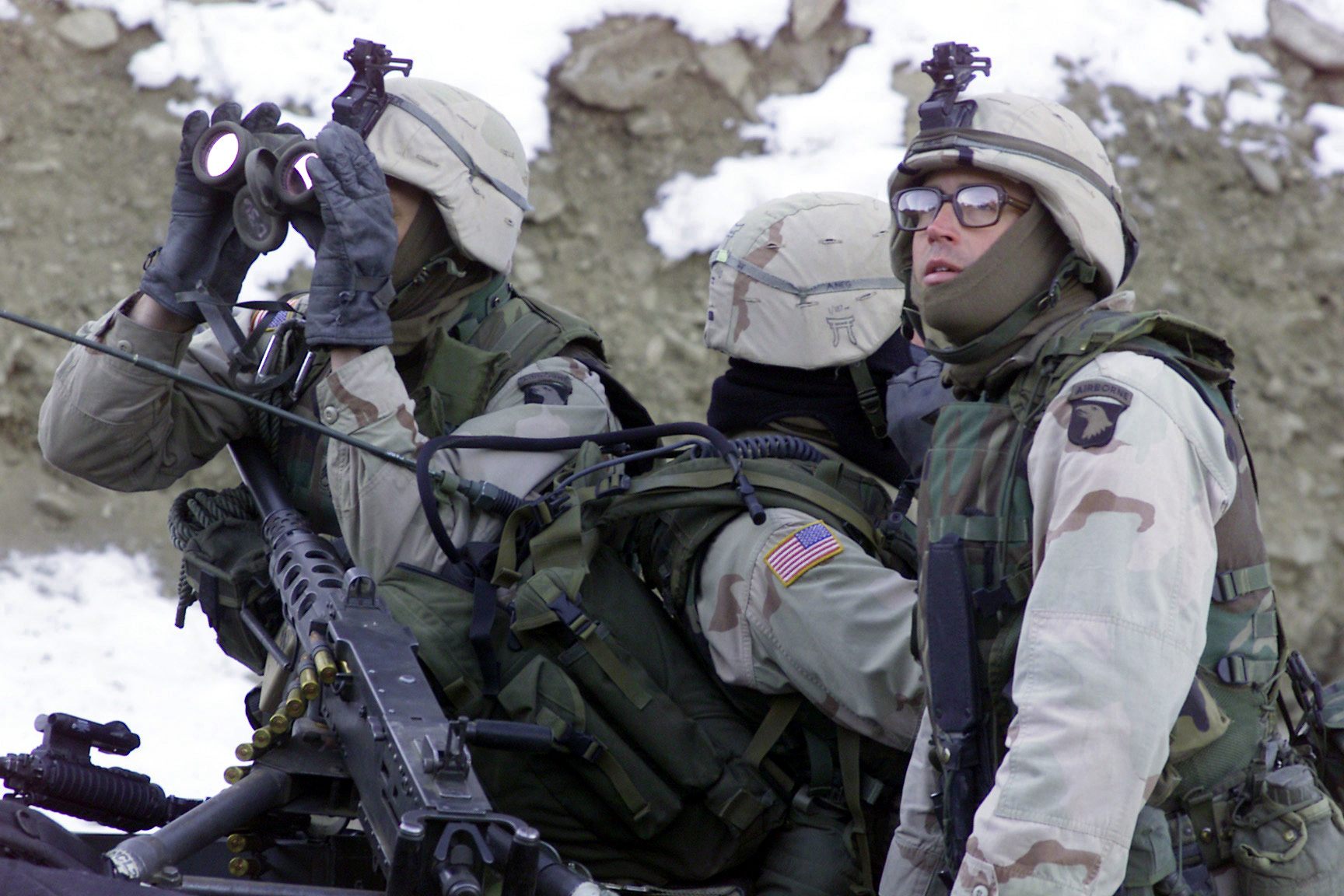
U.S. soldiers from the 1st Battalion, 187th Infantry Regiment, 101st Airborne Division (Air Assault), scan the ridgeline for enemy forces during Operation Anaconda, 4 March 2002.

In 2001–2002, following the attacks of 9–11, the Rakkasans deployed to Afghanistan as Task Force Rakkasan under the command of Colonel (later Lieutenant General) Frank Wiercinski in support of Operation Enduring Freedom where they most notably participated in Operation Anaconda in the eastern Shah-i-Khot region. The 2d Battalion (Raider Rakkasans) as well as Companies B, C, and D, 1st Battalion (Leader Rakkasan), were awarded the Valorous Unit Award for combat valor during this period.

In 2003, the Rakkasans, commanded by Colonel Mike Linnington, were deployed for the 2003 invasion of Iraq. The 3rd Battalion, 187th Infantry was temporarily attached to the 3rd Infantry Division and accompanied them during the push into Baghdad. While attached to the 3rd Infantry Division, 3rd Battalion cleared the Republican Guard headquarters and Baghdad International Airport in April 2003. For this action the battalion earned an unprecedented fifth Presidential Unit Citation. Following the invasion, 3d Battalion conducted six months of security operations near Rabia, Iraq, on the Syrian border, to block the flow of foreign fighters. Prior to returning stateside in February 2004 the Iron Rakkasans conducted combat operations in Husaybah, Iraq with the 3d Armored Cavalry Regiment. Once back in the US the battalion added a forward support company.

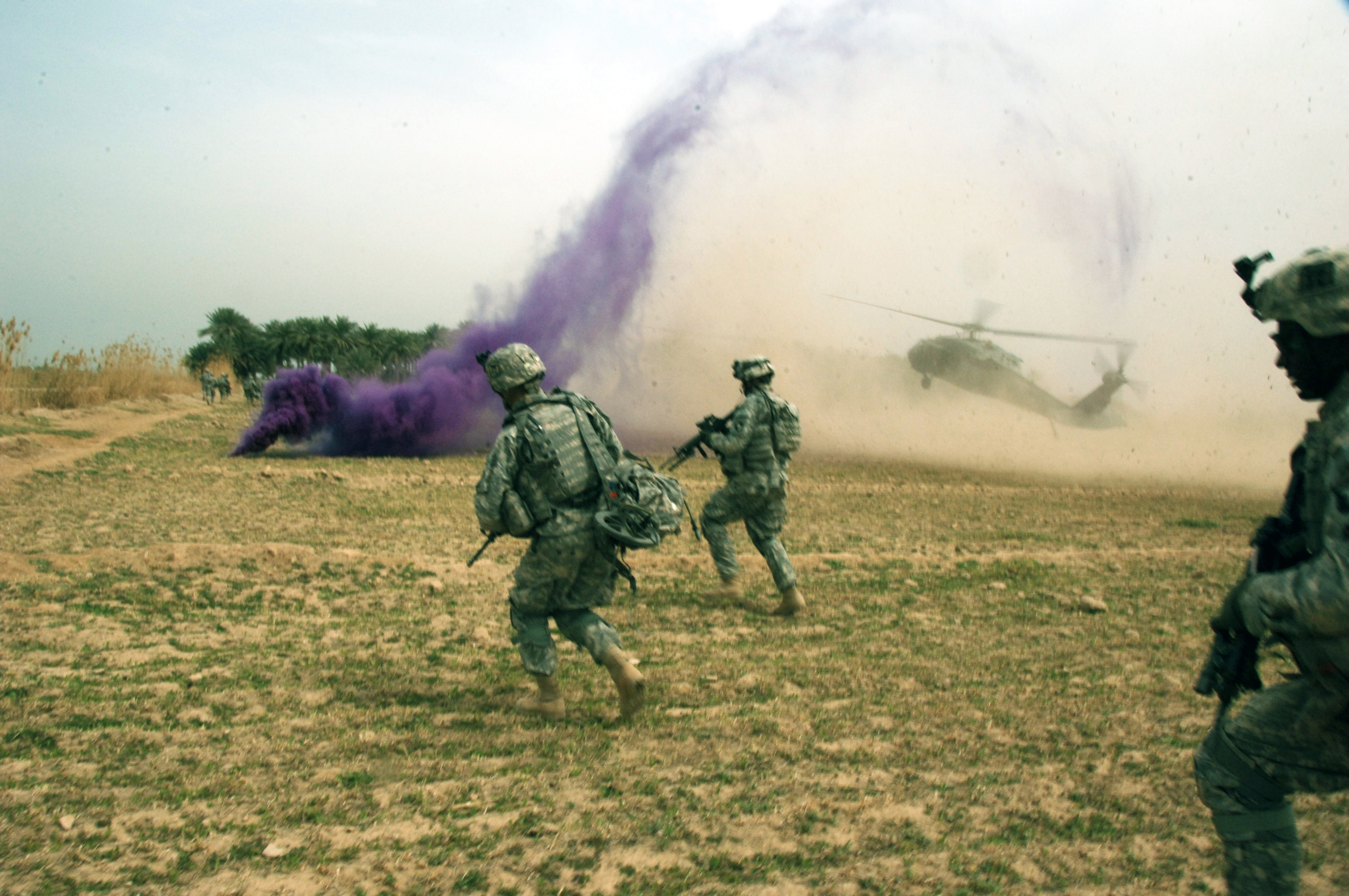
Soldiers of 3rd Battalion run to a Black Hawk helicopter after conducting a search for weapons caches in Albu Issa, Iraq.

Before moving north to Ninawa Governorate (province), the Rakkasans conducted extensive stability and support operations in Baghdad's southeast sector. The Rakkasans conducted the majority of their operations in the northwest of Ninevah province with the 1st Battalion, 187th Infantry focusing efforts around Tallafar, Zumar, and Avgani. The 2d Battalion, 187th Infantry worked primarily around Sinjar and Baji, and the 3d Battalion was headquartered in Rabia.

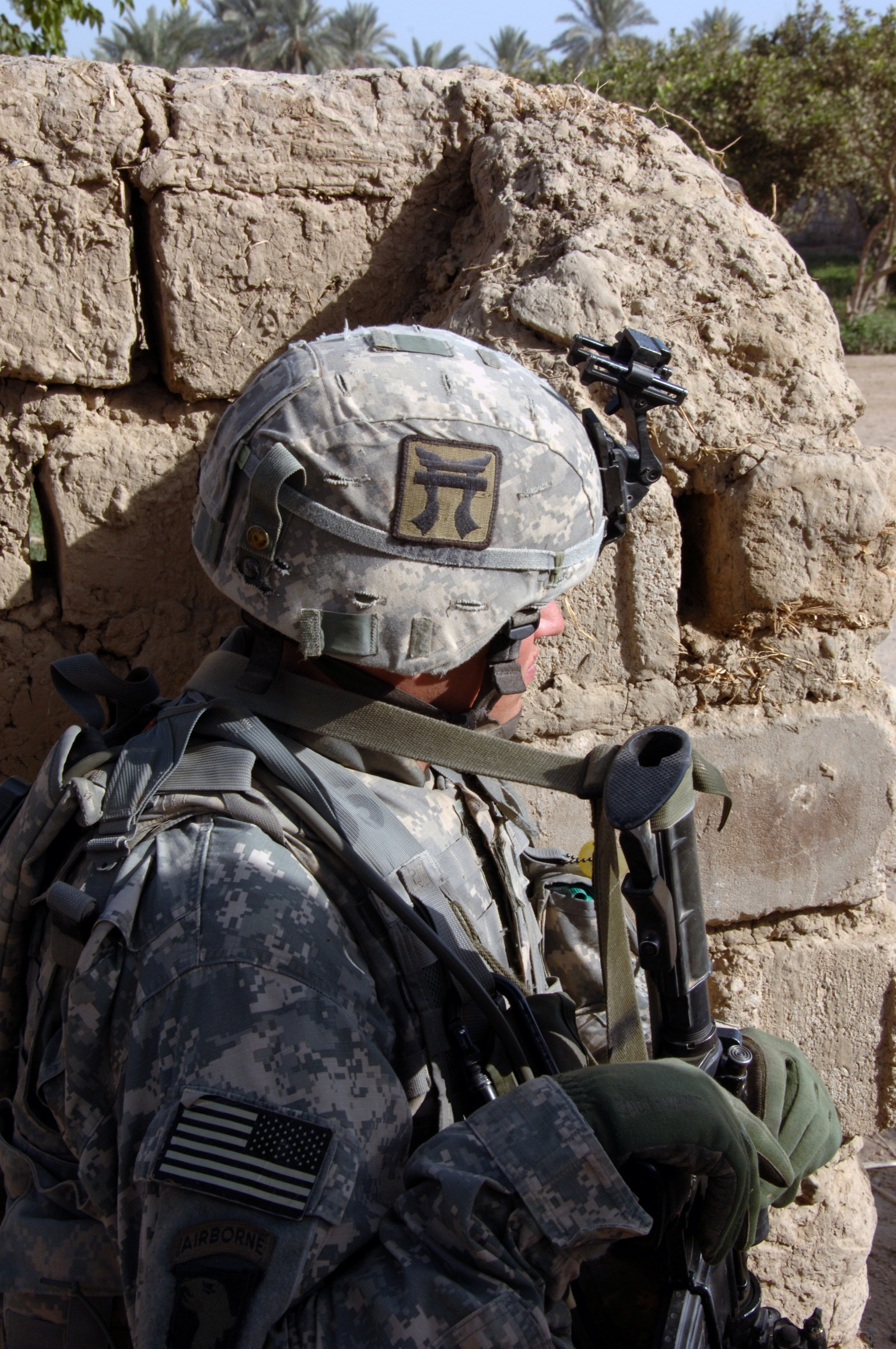
A Rakkasan takes cover behind a mud wall in Iraq. Their helmet has a patch of the unit's distinctive torii symbol.

They returned to Fort Campbell in 2004 and redeployed to Iraq again in the fall of 2005. During their second tour in Iraq, they focused operations in Salah ad Din province, with the 3d Battalion. The brigade commander was Colonel Michael D. Steele. During this deployment that the brigade conducted "Operation Swarmer", one of the largest combat operations in Iraq since the initial invasion. Rakkasans worked with Iraqi Army soldiers throughout Salah ad Din province defeating insurgents, al-Qaeda cells, and uncovering numerous caches of weapons and explosives.

In October 2007 the Rakkasans again deployed to Iraq in support of Operation Iraqi Freedom 07-09 led by brigade commander Col. Dominic Caraccilo. The brigade was headquartered at Camp Striker near Baghdad with an area of operation that extended from the Euphrates river in the west to the Tigris in the east and ran south from Baghdad to Al-Mahmudiyah. This area included the Triangle of Death which had seen significant violence in the war and was often a staging area for the insurgency. As a unit following the surge, the Rakkasans manned combat outposts throughout the rural areas to provide local security for the populace, partner with Iraqi defense and police forces, and facilitate numerous economic and developmental projects. When the Rakkasans redeployed to Fort Campbell at the end of their tour in November 2008, they did not transfer authority to an incoming U.S. military unit. Instead, the area became the responsibility of the partnered Iraqi forces marking a significant step in the transference of security and authority from coalition forces to the Iraqis.

In January 2010, the Rakkasans, now commanded by COL Viet Luong, again deployed to Regional Command East in Afghanistan for a 12-month deployment, where it received the Valorous Unit Award while conducting combat operations in support of Operation Enduring Freedom in the Ghazni, Paktya, Paktika and Khowst Provinces in Eastern Afghanistan during the period 1 April 2010 to 31 August 2010.

Task Force Rakkasan consisted of the following units:

- Headquarters, 3d Brigade Combat Team, 101st Airborne Division
- 1st Battalion, 187th Infantry Regiment
- 3d Battalion, 187th Infantry Regiment
- 3d Battalion 320th Field Artillery Regiment
- 1st Squadron, 33d Cavalry Regiment
- 626th Support Battalion
- Special Troops Battalion, 3d Brigade Combat Team, 101st Airborne Division
- 3d Battalion, 172d Infantry Regiment (Task Force Avalanche)
- Company B, 2d Battalion, 151st Infantry Regiment
- 92d Military Police Company
- 615th Military Police Company (1 April 2010 - 30 April 2010)
- Provincial Reconstruction Team Paktika (Provisional)
- Provincial Reconstruction Team Paktiya (Provisional)
- Provincial Reconstruction Team Khost (Provisional)
- Agribusiness Development Team (Provisional), Oklahoma Army National Guard
- Agribusiness Development Team (Provisional), Indiana Army National Guard

On 6 September 2016, the U.S. Army announced it would deploy about 1,400 soldiers from 3d Brigade Combat Team to Afghanistan in fall 2016 in support of Operation Freedom's Sentinel – the U.S. counter-terrorism operation against the remnants of al-Qaeda, ISIS–K and other terror groups. Senior leadership referred to the 3d Brigade Combat Team as being exceptional. Brig. Gen. Scott Brower stated that the Rakkasans are trained, well-led, and prepared to accomplish any mission given to them.

== Heraldry, lineage, and honors ==
=== Coat of arms ===
- Shield: Azure on a pale nebuly Argent a double handed sword erect Gules.
- Crest: On a wreath Argent and Azure between a Japanese city symbol Gules and a mullet of seven points per fess wavy of the last and of the second, a sea lion Or charged on the shoulder with a heart Purpure and holding in his dexter paw a sword bendwise of the first with hilt and pommel of the fourth the blade notched three times to base of the third.
- Motto: Ne Desit Virtus (Let Valor Not Fail).

The symbolism includes: Slang term : Angels From Hell, For retired insignia.

- Shield:
  - Blue is for the Infantry.
  - The partition line of the pale heraldically representing clouds and the doubled-handed sword, an ancient infantry weapon, symbolizes the character of the organization as an Airborne Infantry unit.
- Crest: The golden seal lion, adapted from the seal of the president of the Philippines, represents the award of the Philippine Presidential Unit Streamer for the campaign on Manarawat, scene of the first combat jump of the 187th.
  - The heart on the lion's shoulder points out the action on Purple Heart Hill.
  - The winged sword with three notches in the blade signifies the unit's score of three combat jumps, one in the Philippines and two in Korea.
  - The red diamond shape is the insignia of the city of Yokohama, Japan, where the 187th landed as the first American combat troops and began four years of occupation duty.
  - The seven-pointed star, divided in the manner of the Korean Taeguk stands for the unit's seven campaigns in that country.

The coat of arms was originally approved on 15 December 1952 for the 187th Airborne Infantry Regiment. It was redesignated for the 187th Infantry Regiment on 7 February 1958.

=== Helmet insignia ===
Members of the 187th have informally worn torii patches or designs on their helmets in honor of the unit's parachuting into Japan.

=== Lineage ===
- Regiment Constituted 12 November 1942 in the Army of the United States as the 187th Glider Infantry Regiment.
- Assigned 25 February 1943 to the 11th Airborne Division and activated at Camp Mackall, North Carolina.
- Allotted 15 November 1948 to the Regular Army.
- Reorganized and redesignated 30 June 1949 as the 187th Airborne Infantry Regiment
- Reorganized as the 187th Airborne Regimental Combat Team on 1 August 1950 and posted to Japan where it served in the Korean War
- Relieved 1 February 1951 from assignment to the 11th Airborne Division.
- Regiment assigned 1 July 1956 to the 101st Airborne Division.
- Company A reorganized and redesignated 1 March 1957 as Headquarters and Headquarters Company, 1st Airborne Battle Group, 187th Infantry, relieved from assignment to the 101st Airborne Division, and assigned to the 11th Airborne Division (organic elements concurrently constituted and activated).
- On 25 April 1957, the following actions took place:
1. Regimental Headquarters relieved from assignment to the 101st Airborne Division; concurrently reorganized and redesignated as the 187th Infantry, a parent regiment under the Combat Arms Regimental System.
2. Company B reorganized and redesignated Headquarters and Headquarters Company, 2d Airborne Battle Group, 187th Infantry, and remained assigned to the 101st Airborne Division (organic elements concurrently constituted and activated)
3. Company C inactivated at Fort Campbell, Kentucky, and relieved from assignment to the 101st Airborne Division; concurrently redesignated as Headquarters and Headquarters Company, 3d Airborne Battle Group, 187th Infantry
- 1st Airborne Battle Group relieved 1 July 1958 from assignment to the 11th Airborne Division and assigned to the 24th Infantry Division.
- 1st Airborne Battle Group relieved 8 February 1959 from assignment to the 24th Infantry Division, and assigned to the 82d Airborne Division.
- HHC 3d Airborne Battle Group redesignated 1 February 1963 as Headquarters and Headquarters Company, 3d Battalion, 187th Infantry, and assigned to the 11th Air Assault Division (organic elements concurrently constituted)
- 3d Battalion activated 7 February 1963 at Fort Benning, Georgia.
- The following actions took place on 1 February 1964:
1. 1st Battalion, 187th Infantry Regiment constituted and activated at Fort Benning, Georgia, as an element of the 11th Air Assault Division.
2. 2d Airborne Battle Group relieved from assignment to the 101st Airborne Division.
3. 3d Battalion relieved from assignment to the 11th Air Assault Division and assigned to the 101st Airborne Division.
- 2d Airborne Battle Group inactivated 3 February 1964 at Fort Campbell, Kentucky.
- 1st Airborne Battle Group inactivated 25 May 1964 at Fort Bragg, North Carolina; concurrently consolidated with the 1st Battalion, 187th Infantry, and consolidated unit designated as the 1st Battalion, 187th Infantry, an element of the 11th Air Assault Division (later redesignated as the 11th Airborne Division)
- On 1 October 1983, the following actions took place:
1. 187th Infantry Regiment Regiment withdrawn from the Combat Arms Regimental System and reorganized under the United States Army Regimental System
2. HHC 1st Battalion relieved from assignment to the 11th Airborne Division, assigned to the 193rd Infantry Brigade, and activated in Panama.
3. HHC 2d Airborne Battle Group redesignated as HHC 2d Battalion, 187th Infantry, assigned to the 193d Infantry Brigade, and activated in Panama
- 1st Battalion inactivated 1 May 1987 in Panama and relieved from assignment to the 193d Infantry Brigade.
- 2d Battalion inactivated 10 July 1987 in Panama and relieved from assignment to the 193d Infantry Brigade.
- On 16 September 1987, the following actions took place:
1. 1st Battalion activated at Fort Campbell, Kentucky and assigned to 101st Airborne Division.
2. 2d Battalion activated at Fort Campbell, Kentucky and assigned to 101st Airborne Division.
- On 16 September 2004, 1st Battalion and 3d Battalion were relieved from assignment to the 101st Airborne Division and assigned to the 3d Brigade Combat Team, 101st Airborne Division.
- On 1 October 2005, the following actions took place:
1. 1st Battalion, 187th Infantry redesignated as the 1st Battalion, 187th Infantry Regiment
2. 3d Battalion, 187th Infantry redesignated as the 3d Battalion, 187th Infantry Regiment

=== Campaign participation credit ===
- World War II:
1. New Guinea;
2. Leyte;
3. Luzon (with arrowhead)
- Korean War:
1. UN Offensive (with arrowhead);
2. CCF Intervention;
3. First UN Counteroffensive (with arrowhead);
4. CCF Spring Offensive;
5. Korea, Summer-Fall 1952;
6. Korea, Summer 1953
- Vietnam War:
1. Counteroffensive, Phase III;
2. Tet Counteroffensive;
3. Counteroffensive, Phase IV;
4. Counteroffensive, Phase V;
5. Counteroffensive, Phase VI;
6. Tet 69/Counteroffensive;
7. Summer-Fall 1969;
8. Winter-Spring 1970;
9. Sanctuary Counteroffensive;
10. Counteroffensive, Phase VII;
11. Consolidation I;
12. Consolidation II
- Southwest Asia War (Gulf War):
1. Defense of Saudi Arabia;
2. Liberation and Defense of Kuwait

=== Decorations ===
The 187th is one the most highly decorated units in the United States Army. Its unit awards include the following:

- Presidential Unit Citation (Army) for:
1. TAGAYTAY RIDGE
2. SUKCHON
3. TRANG BANG
4. DONG AP BIA MOUNTAIN
5. OIF 1
- Presidential Unit Citation (Navy) for:
1. INCHON
- Valorous Unit Award for:
1. BINH DUONG PROVINCE
2. THUA THIEN PROVINCE
3. OPERATION ANACONDA (OEF 1)
4. GHAZNI, PAKTYA, PAKTIKA, AND KHOWST PROVINCE (OEF 4)
5. PAKTYA, PAKTIKA, AND KHOST PROVINCE (OEF 10/11)
- Meritorious Unit Commendation (Army) for:
1. VIETNAM 1968
2. SOUTHWEST ASIA
3. OIF 1
- Army Superior Unit Award for 1995–1996
- Philippine Presidential Unit Citation for 17 October 1944 to 4 July 1945.
- Republic of Korea Presidential Unit Citation for:
1. KOREA 1950–1952
2. KOREA 1952–1953

== Notable members ==
- GEN William Westmoreland, commanded the Rakkasans during the Korean War from November 1952 to 1953, and later commanded Military Assistance Command, Vietnam (MACV) and served as Chief of Staff of the US Army
- GEN David Petraeus, former 3rd Battalion commander, later Director of CIA
- GEN Melvin Zais, commanded the 101st Airborne Division in Vietnam
- GEN Norman Schwarzkopf, Jr., leader of coalition forces during Gulf War briefly executive officer of a company in 1950s
- MAJOR GEN Frank S. Bowen Commander throughout the Korean War and later commander of Fort Jackson, South Carolina.
- LTG Robert L. Caslen, Jr., Rakkasan combat vet from the First Gulf War later Superintendent of the United States Military Academy
- COL Michael D. Steele, Former 187th commander, commanded Ranger company during the Battle of Mogadishu.
- LTC Ronald Speirs, former company commander of E Co, 506th Parachute Infantry Regiment, served as a rifle company commander with the 187th Regimental Combat Team during Operation: Tomahawk
- 2LT Pete Hegseth, served as an augmentee with the 3rd Battalion from 2004 to 2005 as an Infantry Platoon Leader, later 29th Secretary of Defense
- CPT Paul W. Bucha, Medal of Honor (Vietnam)
- SMA George W. Dunaway, second Sergeant Major of the Army, was sergeant major of the 187th from 1954 to 1960
- SGM Eric J Geressy (Iraq) Distinguished Service Cross, Silver Star Medal, Three Bronze Star Medals, and the Army Commendation Medal for Valor
- MSG Albert Blithe, WWII member of 506th Parachute Infantry Regiment, portrayed in the TV-series Band of Brothers
- MSG Clifford R. Rodriguez, Silver Star, Distinguished Service Cross (posthumously), Korea.
- CPL Lester Hammond, Jr., Medal of Honor (Korea)
- LTC Charles Lockie, Silver and Bronze Star (Korea)
- CPL Rodolfo P. Hernandez, Medal of Honor (Korea)
- SPC Ryan A. Conklin, reality TV star and author of An Angel From Hell which chronicled A Co. 3/187th Infantry during the Iraq deployment of 2005–2006.
- PFC Richard G. Wilson, Medal of Honor (Korea)
- PFC Stephen Flemmi, Silver Star (Korea), later became Winter Hill Gang member then and FBI informant
- SPC Deric L. Hernandez, Awarded Army Commendation Medal for Valor (Iraq).
- SPC Bill A. Soliz Combat Medic in First Gulf War Bronze Star, HHC 2/187th Rakkasans, later became Brigadier General first physician assistant in the military to be promoted to General Officer.

== In popular culture ==
- The "Rakkasans" are portrayed in the 1987 film Hamburger Hill.
- The 187th AIR is also portrayed in the 2003 film Big Fish. Ewan McGregor's character returns home from the Korean War wearing the 187 Airborne Infantry Regiment patch.

== See also ==
- 3rd Battalion, 187th Infantry Regiment
- Special Troops Battalion, 3rd Brigade, 101st Airborne Division (Air Assault)
