= 3rd Battalion, 187th Infantry Regiment =

Element of the U.S. 101st Airborne Division

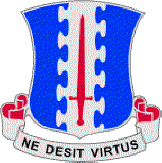
- 187th Infantry Regiment's distinctive unit insignia
- Founded: 1943
- Country: United States
- Branch: United States Army
- Garrison/HQ: Fort Campbell, Kentucky, U.S.
- Nickname: "Iron Rakkasans"
- Motto: "Iron Sharpens Iron"
- Engagements: World War II; Korean War; Vietnam War; First Gulf War; War in Afghanistan; War in Iraq

Commanders
- Commanding officer: LTC Drew Schaub, USA
- Command sergeant major: CSM Daniel J. Murphy, USA

Insignia
- 3rd Battalion, 187th Infantry Regiment Airborne Background Trimming

- Historical beret flash of the battalion, currently being informally worn on the Army Black Beret

The 3rd Battalion, 187th Infantry Regiment, also known as the Iron Rakkasans, is a battalion of the US Army 187th Infantry Regiment. The battalion was activated on 25 February 1943 and first saw action in the Pacific Theater of the Second World War, during the battle to regain US control of the Philippines. Troops from the battalion then served in the four-year occupation of Japan, where they earned their nickname "Rakkasans" (meaning "umbrella"), before stationing in Fort Campbell, Kentucky. The battalion served in the Korean War from 1950 as the 187th Airborne Regimental Combat Team and participated in 12 major missions during the Vietnam War, emerging from that conflict as the US's most highly decorated airborne battalion. In 1992 they were designated as the "Iron" Rakkasans by Lieutenant Colonel David Petraeus due to his Leader Rakkasan physical fitness test that added a fourth element of pull-ups to the standard APFT. The battalion has received numerous awards and commendations, including six Presidential Unit Citations and four Valorous Unit Awards.

== World War II ==
The 3rd Battalion, 187th Infantry Regiment was activated on 25 February 1943 at Camp Mackall, North Carolina as part of the 187th Glider Infantry Regiment. In March 1944, the battalion deployed to the Pacific Theater as part of the 11th Airborne Division. After six months of training in New Guinea, the 187th was committed to combat in Leyte in the campaign to regain control of the Philippine Islands. In the subsequent fighting the unit repelled and destroyed a 500-man Japanese parachute assault and earned the battalion's first Presidential Unit Citation (Army). It also participated in an amphibious assault on southern Luzon, forced a Japanese retreat at the battle of Tagatay Ridge, and pierced the Genko defensive line during the attack on Manila. For its actions during World War II, the Rakkasans received three campaign streamers.

== Korean War ==
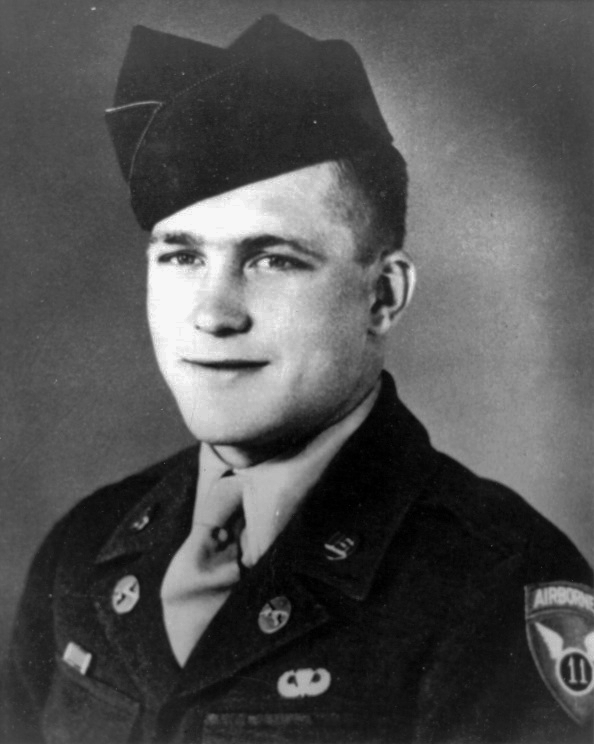
Private First Class Richard Wilson

With the outbreak of the Korean War the Rakkasans returned to Asia as a separate unit, the 187th Airborne Regimental Combat Team, in September 1950. Shortly after their arrival the Rakkasans earned a Presidential Unit Citation (Navy) for the attack up the Kimpo Peninsula as part of the amphibious assault at Inchon. They also earned a second Presidential Unit Citation (Army) for a parachute assault north of Pyongyang, North Korea at Sukchon-Sunchon in October 1950. At Sukchon, Private First Class Richard G. Wilson, a medic attached to I Company, earned the Medal of Honor when he gave his life as he administered aid and shielded wounded troopers from enemy fire. In March 1951 the regiment made a second combat jump at Musan-ni, cutting off and destroying large numbers of North Korean and Chinese forces above the 38th parallel. Nearly two years later, in June 1952, the Rakkasans helped quell the prison riots on the island of Koje-do. For their efforts during the Korean War, the battalion earned six campaign streamers.

== Vietnam War ==
The Rakkasans moved back to Fort Campbell, Kentucky in February 1964, to serve as part of the 3rd Brigade, 101st Airborne Division. In December 1967, the 3rd Battalion deployed to Vietnam, alongside 1st and 2nd Battalion, 506th Infantry Regiment. Over the next four years the Rakkasans fought in twelve major campaigns, conducting numerous air assaults and search and destroy missions. During one such mission in March 1968, Captain Paul W. Bucha, commander of D Company, received the Medal of Honor when he crawled through a hail of fire to single-handedly destroy a machine gun bunker with grenades near Phước Vĩnh. When the battalion colors returned to Fort Campbell, the unit had distinguished itself by earning two Valorous Unit Awards, and its third and fourth Presidential Unit Citations for the battles of Trang Bang and Dong Ap Bia Mountain (commonly known as "Hamburger Hill"). The Rakkasans emerged from the Vietnam War as the country's most highly decorated airborne battalion.

== Desert Storm ==
In August 1990 the battalion deployed to Saudi Arabia as part of Operations Desert Shield and Desert Storm. During Operation Desert Storm the Rakkasans participated in the largest air assault in history, conducting a vertical envelopment 175 miles into enemy territory to establish blocking positions near the Euphrates River. The air assault isolated the Iraqi Republican Guard and helped bring a quick conclusion to the war. The battalion earned two campaign streamers during Operations Desert Shield and Desert Storm. The 3rd Battalion, at that time known as the Leader Rakassan Battalion, also deployed to the Sinai Peninsula from July 1995 to January 1996 to keep the peace between Egypt and Israel. The unit's motto was Rakkasans Lead the Way.

== Afghanistan ==
After the attacks on the World Trade Center and the Pentagon on 11 September 2001, the battalion once again saw active overseas service. From January to August 2002 the Leader Rakkasans deployed to Afghanistan as part of Operation Enduring Freedom, where it participated in numerous search and attacks, raids, and air assaults against the elusive remnants of the Taliban near the Pakistan border, helping to stabilize the country. For its actions, the battalion earned the Afghanistan campaign streamer.

In February 2010, the Iron Rakkasans returned to Afghanistan in support of Operation Enduring Freedom. Once arriving in Western Paktika Province the battalion partnered with the Afghan National Security Forces in securing the population. In August 2010 the battalion relocated to Andar District, Ghazni Province. At deployments end, the battalion conducted over 5,000 combat patrols and 33 air assaults. The Iron Rakkasans returned to Ft. Campbell in February 2011. For their actions from 1 April 2010 to 31 August 2010, the Iron Rakkasans were awarded the Valorous Unit Award.

From September 2012 to May 2013, the Iron Rakkasans deployed to eastern Khowst Province, Afghanistan, in support of Operation Enduring Freedom 12-13. The battalion and its combat advisor comrades partnered with a host of Afghan units to promote Afghan National Security Forces (ANSF) development, capabilities, and security. They operated alongside Afghan National Army (ANA) and Afghan National Police (ANP), helping them gain confidence in securing the population. In addition to helping the ANSF operate independently, the battalion also assisted the ANSF in disrupting the enemy's leadership and attack facilitation efforts in this challenging border region.

== Iraq ==
In February 2003 the Iron Rakkasans deployed to Kuwait as part of the invasion force for Operation Iraqi Freedom. While attached to the 3rd Infantry Division the battalion cleared the Republican Guard Headquarters and Baghdad International Airport in April 2003. For this action the battalion earned an unprecedented fifth Presidential Unit Citation. Following the invasion the battalion conducted six months of security operations near Rabia, Iraq, on the Syrian border, to block the flow of foreign fighters. Prior to returning stateside in January 2004 the Iron Rakkasans conducted combat operations in Husaybah, Iraq with the 3rd Armored Cavalry Regiment. Once back in the US the battalion added a forward support company and was disbanded.

No longer the infantry battalion it once was, the new CAV battalion returned to Iraq in September 2005 and fought from FOB Falcon in Baghdad for three months, before moving north to Forward Operating Base (FOB) Brassfield-Mora in Samarra, along the Tigris River. While the battalion was serving in Samarra the Golden Dome Mosque, a Shi’ite holy site, was blown up by insurgents. This created a volatile situation which the Leader Rakkasans defused with precise counterinsurgency operations. The battalion redeployed to Fort Campbell in September 2006. Twelve months later, in September 2007, the Iron Rakkasans deployed as part of the Surge to Yusufiyah, Iraq. During their tour the battalion supervised over 5000 Sons of Iraq (or members of the Awakening); trained and partnered with the 17th Iraqi Army Division; conducted dozens of raids, air assaults, and cordon and searches; and earned the Valorous Unit Award. The battalion's counterinsurgency operations ensured a peaceful transition of control of the area to the Iraqi Security Forces upon redeployment in November 2008. With over three years of combat operations in Iraq, the battalion earned the Iraqi Campaign Streamer.

== Decorations ==
The 3rd Battalion, 187th Infantry Regiment has received five Presidential Unit Citations, Army; one Presidential Unit Citation, Navy; four Valorous Unit Awards; three Meritorious Unit Citations; the Army Superior Unit Award; the Philippine Presidential Unit Citation; two Republic of Korea Presidential Unit Citations; three Republic of Vietnam Crosses of Gallantry with Palm; the Republic of Vietnam Civil Action Honor Medal, First Class; 25 campaign streamers; has executed two combat parachute jumps in the Korean War and one in the Philippines during WWII; and has four Medal of Honor recipients.
