= Rodolfo P. Hernández =

American soldier who received the Medal of Honor (1931–2013)

Rodolfo Pérez Hernández
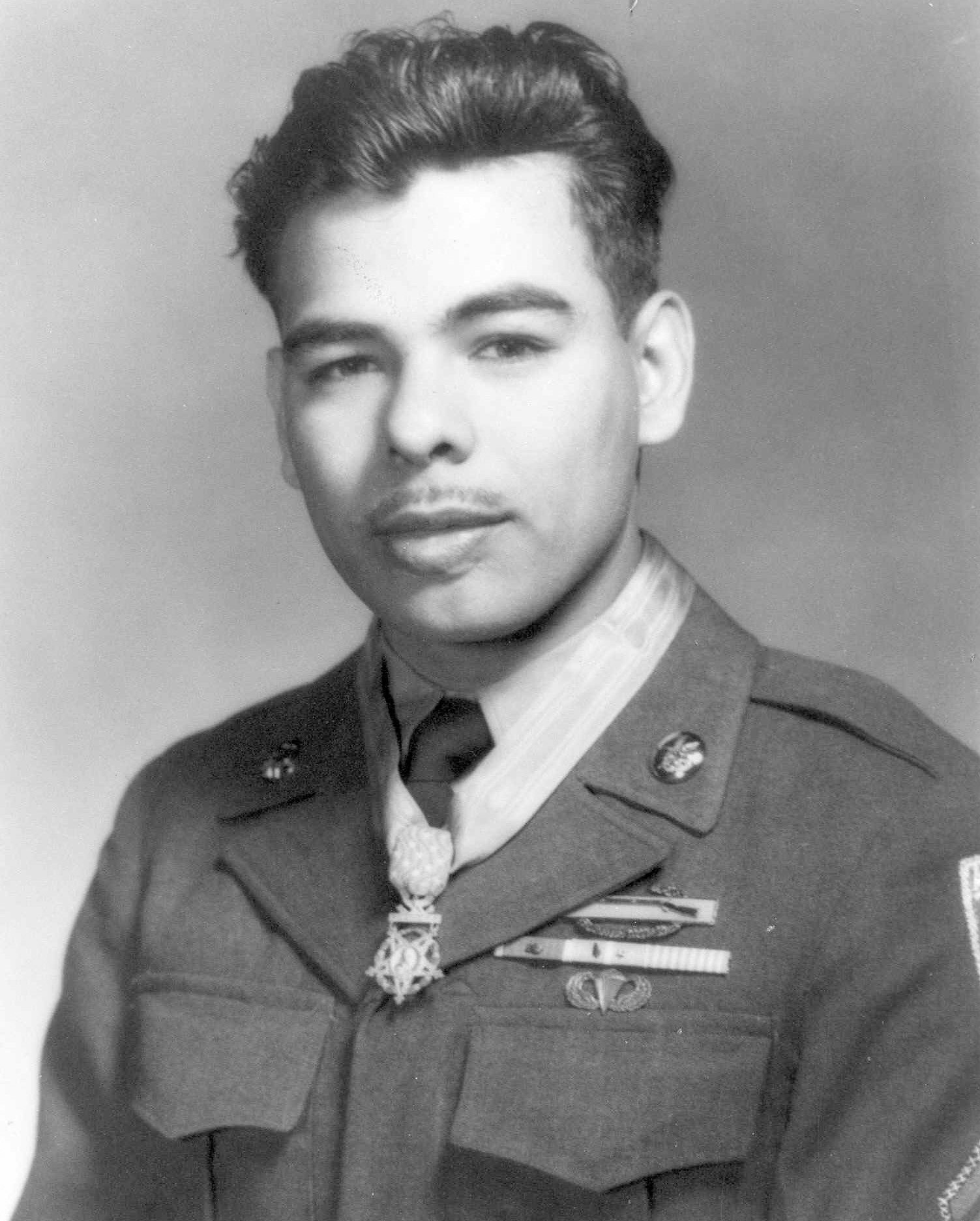
- Hernández wearing his Medal of Honor, c. 1952
- Born: April 14, 1931; Colton, California, U.S.
- Died: December 21, 2013 (aged 82); Fayetteville, North Carolina, U.S.
- Burial place: Sandhills State Veterans Cemetery
- Military career
- Allegiance: United States
- Branch: United States Army
- Service years: 1948–1951
- Rank: Corporal
- Nickname: "Rudy"
- Units: Company G, 187th Airborne Regimental Combat Team
- Conflicts: Korean War
- Awards: Medal of Honor; Purple Heart (2)

Rodolfo "Rudy" Pérez Hernández (April 14, 1931 – December 21, 2013) was a United States Army soldier who was awarded the Medal of Honor — the United States' highest military decoration — for his actions on May 31, 1951, during the UN May–June 1951 counteroffensive in the Korean War. Despite his severe wounds, Hernández took actions during an enemy counterattack near Wonton-ni that allowed his platoon to retake their defensive position.

== Early life and education ==
Hernández, an American of Mexican descent, was born in Colton, California, on April 14, 1931. He was one of eight children born to a farmworker. At a young age his family moved to Fowler, California, where he received his primary education. In 1948, when he was 17 years old, he joined the United States Army with his parents' consent.

After completing his basic training, Hernández volunteered for paratrooper school. Upon the completion of his paratrooper training he was sent to Germany, where he was stationed until the outbreak of the Korean War.

== Korean War ==
On August 27, 1950, the 187th Airborne Infantry Regiment was reorganized and redesignated as the 187th Airborne Regimental Combat Team. The unit was quickly sent to Korea. The 187th Airborne performed operations into Munsan-ni Valley, and fought bloody battles at Inje and Wonton-ni.

Hernández was reassigned to Company G of the 2nd Battalion, 187th Airborne Regimental Combat Team. His platoon was ordered to defend Hill 420, located near Wonton-ni. On May 31, 1951, his platoon was the object of a numerically superior enemy counterattack. A close-quarters firefight broke out when enemy troops surged up the hill and inflicted numerous casualties on the platoon. Hernandez was wounded during the attack, but was able to fire upon the rushing enemy troops. After a cartridge in his rifle ruptured, he continued attacking the enemy with his bayonet. His attack enabled his comrades to regroup and take back the hill.

A grenade explosion that blew away part of his brain knocked him unconscious. Hernández, who had received grenade, bayonet, and bullet wounds, appeared dead to the first medic who reached him, Keith Oates. Oates realized, however, that Hernandez was still alive when he saw him move his fingers. Hernandez woke up a month later in a military hospital, unable to move his arms or legs or to talk.

On April 12, 1952, President Harry S. Truman bestowed upon Hernández the Medal of Honor in a ceremony held in the White House Rose Garden.

After many surgeries and physical therapy over a five-year period, Hernández regained limited use of his right arm and learned to write with his left hand.

== Medal of Honor ==
Hernandez's Medal of Honor citation reads:

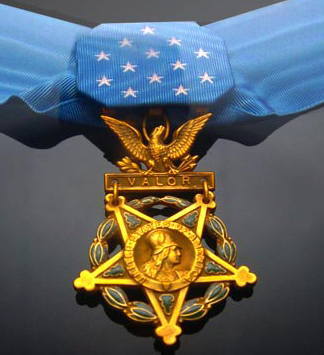

Rodolfo P. Hernández
Rank and organization: Corporal, U.S. Army, Company G, 187th Airborne Regimental Combat Team
Place and date: Near Wontong-ni, Korea, May 31, 1951
Entered service at: Fowler, California
Born: April 14, 1931, Colton, California
G.O. No.: 40, April 12, 1952

Cpl. HERNANDEZ, a member of Company G, distinguished himself by conspicuous gallantry and intrepidity above and beyond the call of duty in action against the enemy. His platoon, in defensive positions on Hill 420, came under ruthless attack by a numerically superior and fanatical hostile force, accompanied by heavy artillery, mortar, and machinegun fire which inflicted numerous casualties on the platoon. His comrades were forced to withdraw due to lack of ammunition but Cpl. HERNANDEZ, although wounded in an exchange of grenades, continued to deliver deadly fire into the ranks of the onrushing assailants until a ruptured cartridge rendered his rifle inoperative. Immediately leaving his position, Cpl. HERNANDEZ rushed the enemy armed only with rifle and bayonet. Fearlessly engaging the foe, he killed 6 of the enemy before falling unconscious from grenade, bayonet, and bullet wounds but his heroic action momentarily halted the enemy advance and enabled his unit to counterattack and retake the lost ground. The indomitable fighting spirit, outstanding courage, and tenacious devotion to duty clearly demonstrated by Cpl. HERNANDEZ reflect the highest credit upon himself, the infantry, and the U.S. Army.

== Later life ==
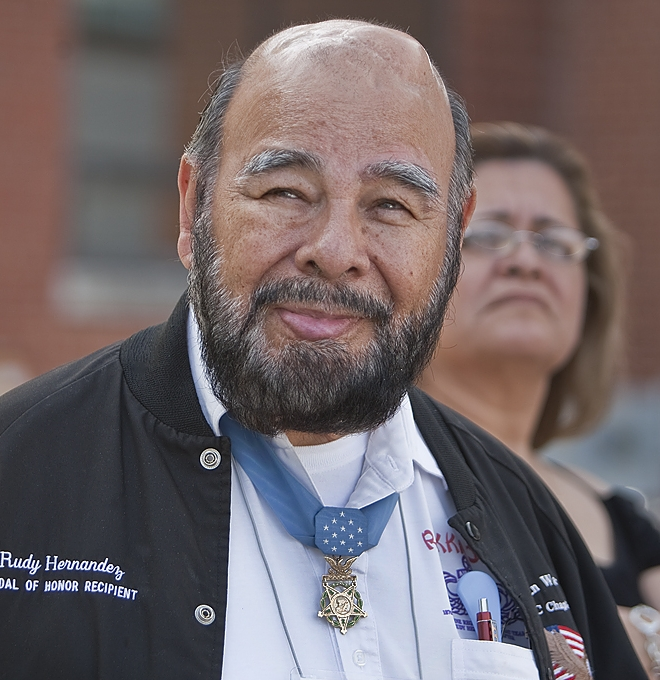
Hernández in 2009

Hernández married and had three children. He retired from a job at the Veterans Administration and lived in Fayetteville, North Carolina. The Carteret County Veterans Council named Hernandez one of two grand marshals of its November 11, 2006, annual Veterans Day Parade held in downtown Morehead City. On November 10, 2007, he was again co-grand marshal of the Morehead City Veterans Day Parade. During the event, he was reunited with his rescuer "from a long and far away battlefield," the former Korean War Army medic and current Morehead City resident, Keith Oates.

Hernández was also the Grand Marshal of the 2012 North Carolina Memorial Day Parade and Ceremony held each Memorial Day in Thomasville, North Carolina, and attended as an honored guest in 2013.

Hernández died at Womack Army Medical Center in Fayetteville on December 21, 2013. He had been battling "cancer and several other ailments" in the last month of his life.

== Military decorations and awards ==
Hernández's military awards include:

Badge	Combat Infantryman Badge		
1st row	Medal of Honor		Purple Heart with 1 Oak leaf cluster
2nd row	Army Good Conduct Medal	Army of Occupation Medal With 'Germany' clasp	National Defense Service Medal
3rd row	Korean Service Medal with 2 Campaign stars	United Nations Service Medal Korea	Korean War Service Medal Retroactively Awarded, 2003
Badge	Parachutists Badge		
Unit awards	Presidential Unit Citation		Korean Presidential Unit Citation

== See also ==
- List of Korean War Medal of Honor recipients
- List of Hispanic Medal of Honor recipients
