= General Bowen =

General Bowen may refer to:

- Frank S. Bowen (1905–1976), U.S. Army major general
- James Bowen (railroad executive) (1808–1886), Union Army brigadier general
- John S. Bowen (1830–1863), Confederate States Army major general
- Thomas M. Bowen (1835–1906), Union Army brevet brigadier general
- William Bowen (British Army officer) (1898–1961), British Army major general

== See also ==
- Liu Bowen (family name "Liu", 1311–1375), Ming dynasty general
- Attorney General Bowen (disambiguation)
