= Hamburger Hill =

1987 film by John Irvin

- Theatrical release poster
- Directed by: John Irvin
- Written by: James Carabatsos
- Produced by: Marcia Nasatir; James Carabatsos
- Starring: Michael Patrick Boatman; Don Cheadle; Dylan McDermott; Tim Quill; Courtney B. Vance; Steven Weber
- Cinematography: Peter MacDonald
- Edited by: Peter Tanner
- Music by: Philip Glass
- Production company: RKO Pictures
- Distributed by: Paramount Pictures
- Release date: August 28, 1987
- Running time: 110 minutes
- Country: United States
- Language: English
- Budget: $6.5 million
- Box office: $13.8 million

Hamburger Hill is a 1987 American war film set during the Battle of Hamburger Hill, a May 1969 assault during the Vietnam War by the U.S. Army's 3rd Battalion, 187th Infantry, 101st Airborne Division, on a ridge of Dong Ap Bia near the Laotian border in central Vietnam. The ridge was a well-fortified position, including trenchworks and bunkers, of the North Vietnamese Army. U.S. military records of the battle refer to the mountain as "Hill 937," its map designation having been derived from the high elevation of the hill at 937 meters (3,074 ft).

Written by James Carabatsos and directed by John Irvin, the film starred Michael Boatman, Don Cheadle, Dylan McDermott (his film debut), Courtney B. Vance, Steven Weber and Tim Quill. It was produced by RKO Pictures and distributed by Paramount Pictures, and was shot in the Philippines. The novelization was written by William Pelfrey.

== Plot ==
In 1969, a platoon of the 3rd Battalion, 187th Infantry, 101st Airborne Division, receives five inexperienced replacements: Privates Beletsky, "Alphabet" Languilli, Washburn, Bienstock and Galvan. The platoon sergeant, Sergeant First Class Worcester, is breaking in platoon leader Lieutenant Eden. The replacements are assigned to 3rd Squad, led by battle-weary Staff Sergeant Frantz. The platoon's specialists include the machine gun team of Duffy and Gaigin, along with African-American veterans Motown, "Doc" Johnson and Sergeant McDaniel who share experiences of racial discrimination in the army. The new arrivals get their first, sudden taste of war when a mortar barrage decapitates Galvan.

The platoon is air-lifted into the A Sầu Valley for an assault on Hill 937. McDaniel, whose tour of duty is nearly over, is killed in a firefight shortly after landing. Doc blames Frantz for not getting the short-timer McDaniel a less dangerous assignment. The platoon goes into action at Hill 937, soon nicknamed Hamburger Hill when unexpectedly determined resistance is encountered from NVA defenders in well-entrenched positions. Between assaults, US air-strikes steadily strip away vegetation, leaving the hill a barren, scorched wasteland. Morale sinks when a battle-crazed and wounded Duffy, clearing positions with an M60 machine gun, is killed by botched air support.

During lulls in the fighting the shrinking platoon discusses social upheaval and unrest back home. Bienstock is devastated by a letter from his girlfriend, whose college friends have branded her immoral for remaining with a soldier. Worcester describes the hostility he and his friends received from anti-war college students, and the breakdown of his marriage, on his return from a previous tour of duty.

On the battle's seventh day, returning downhill from their ninth assault, Frantz vents his own hostility on a reporter, telling him he respects NVA they're fighting more than him, then threatens to shoot the reporter if he takes pictures when the hill is secured. During a tenth assault in torrential rain, Gaigin is killed while Beletsky and Doc are wounded. Doc tells Frantz and Motown to capture the hill so that they will at least have something to be proud of, then succumbs to his wounds. Beletsky returns to action despite having a "million dollar wound".

The eleventh and final assault, mounted by troops whose bitterness and exhaustion is overcome by desperation and unit pride, overruns the final enemy positions at heavy cost. Lieutenant Eden loses his right arm when his radioman is killed. Worcester stumbles back to Frantz and dies in his friend's arms. Murphy, Motown, Bienstock, and Languilli are also killed. A dazed Frantz joins Beletsky in an enraged final push to the summit where they join Washburn as the battlefield finally goes silent.

The film's epilogue is a poem by Major Michael Davis O'Donnell, written on January 1, 1970, at Đăk Tô: "If you are able, save for them a place inside of you and save one backward glance when you are leaving for the places they can no longer go. Be not ashamed to say you loved them, though you may not have always. Take what they have left and what they have taught you with their dying and keep it with your own. And in that time when men decide and feel safe to call the war insane, take one moment to embrace those gentle heroes you left behind."

== Cast ==
NOTE: Listed in order of authority and rank. The green color coded boxes in the rows indicate that character survived the battle. The pink colored boxes indicate the character either died or was wounded. Actors and roles as credited onscreen.

Actor	Character	Classification	Primary Weapon(s)	Rank
Tegan West	Lt. Eden	Platoon Leader	M16A1	Second Lieutenant
Steven Weber	Worcester	Platoon Sergeant	M16A1	Sergeant First Class
Dylan McDermott	Frantz	3rd Squad Leader	M16A1	Staff Sergeant
Don James	McDaniel	3rd Squad Assistant Leader/ Grenadier	M79 Grenade Launcher	Sergeant
Courtney B. Vance	Doc	Medic	M16A1	Specialist Four
Michael Patrick Boatman	Motown	Rifleman	M16A1	Specialist Four
Harry O'Reilly	Duffy	Machine Gunner	M60 Machine Gun	Specialist Four
Daniel O'Shea	Gaigin	Assistant Gunner/ Machine Gunner	M16A1 / M60 Machine Gun	Specialist Four
Michael Dolan	Murphy	Radioman	M16A1	Specialist Four
M.A. Nickles	Galvan	Rifleman	M16A1	Private First Class
Don Cheadle	Washburn	Rifleman/ Machine Gunner	M16A1 / M60 Machine Gun	Private First Class
Tim Quill	Beletsky	Rifleman/ Grenade Launcher	M16A1 / M79 Grenade Launcher	Private First Class
Tommy Swerdlow	Bienstock	Rifleman/ Machine Gunner	M16A1 / M60 Machine Gun	Private First Class
Anthony Barrile	Languilli (a.k.a. Alphabet)	Rifleman	M16A1	Private First Class

== Production ==
Producer Marcia Nasatir had a son who fought as a soldier in the Vietnam War, which is one of the reasons why she came up with the idea for the film. Writer and co-producer James Carabatsos had served with the 1st Cavalry Division in 1968–69 and spent five years interviewing soldiers involved in the combat there and researching the Battle of Hamburger Hill. John Irvin, an English-born filmmaker, worked on several documentaries in Vietnam in 1969.

The film was produced independently, with the money being raised through foreign sales. According to Irvin, Paramount passed on Hamburger Hill when they initially pitched it, but they picked it up when the film was finally shot in the Philippines.

== Release ==
In a 2021 interview, John Irvin said that Hamburger Hill could have been released before Platoon and Full Metal Jacket "if Paramount had been a bit braver". Because Vietnam was not considered a popular subject, Paramount wanted to see how Platoon performed at the box office. According to Irvin, Hamburger Hill was again pushed back when Stanley Kubrick pushed for Full Metal Jacket to be released before Hamburger Hill.

== Reception ==
=== Box office ===
In the United States and Canada, Hamburger Hill grossed $13.8 million at the box office. It opened at No. 4 for its first weekend, spending its first three weeks in the Top 10 at the box office.

=== Critical response ===
On Rotten Tomatoes, the film has an approval rating of 100% based on 10 reviews. Metacritic, which uses a weighted average, assigned the film a score of 64 out of 100, based on 17 critics, indicating "generally favorable" reviews.

Vincent Canby of The New York Times called Hamburger Hill a "well-made Vietnam War film that narrows its attention to the men of a single platoon in a specific operation". Differentiating the film from Platoon, released the year before, he noted the film "refuses to put its characters and events into any larger frame. It could have been made a week after the conclusion of the operation it recalls, which is both its strength and weakness, depending on how you look at it". Hal Hinson of The Washington Post credited the filmmakers for creating a "deeply affecting, highly accomplished film", but felt that "[Carabatsos] and his collaborators seem to feel compelled not only to show us their war, but tell us what we're to think about it", weakening the film's effect and keeping it from being a "great war movie".

== Novelization ==
The novelized version of the film, written by William Pelfrey, based on the screenplay by James Carabatsos, featured several additional scenes not featured in the final cut of the film. These included prologue and epilogue scenes set years after the war where Frantz, now a civilian and happily married with children, visits the Vietnam Memorial Wall in Washington, D.C. and asks his young son to plant a small flag below Languilli's name. Another additional scene occurs one night between the assaults on Hill 937, where the North Vietnamese Army launch a surprise counterattack.
