= Operation Tomahawk =

1951 airborne military operation during the Korean War

- Part of Korean War
Date	23 March 1951
Location	Korea
Result	United Nations victory

Belligerents
United Nations: United States; Philippines; India (Medical support)	China; North Korea

Commanders and leaders
(United States) Frank S. Bowen	

Strength
(United States) 3,437 (India) 12	Unknown

Casualties and losses
(United States) 19 killed, dozens wounded, one C-119 destroyed	136 killed, 149 captured

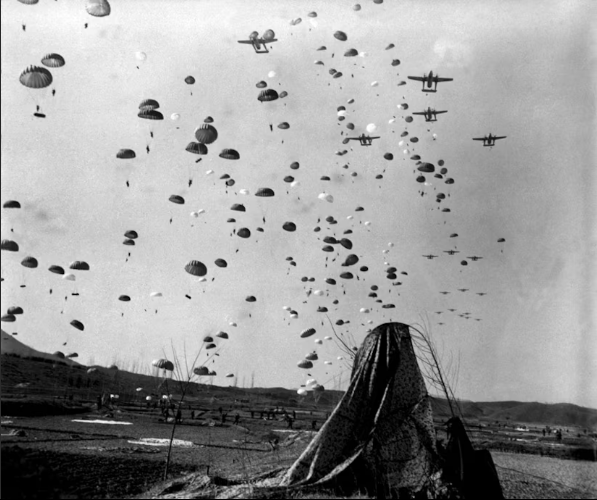
187th Regimental Combat Team, during Operation Tomahawk 23-March-1951

Operation Tomahawk was an airborne military operation by the 187th Regimental Combat Team (187th RCT) on 23 March 1951 at Munsan-ni as part of Operation Courageous in the Korean War. Operation Courageous was designed to trap large numbers of Chinese People's Volunteer Army (PVA) and Korean People's Army (KPA) forces between the Han and Imjin Rivers north of Seoul, opposite the Republic of Korea Army (ROK) I Corps. The intent of Operation Courageous was for US I Corps, which was composed of the US 25th and 3rd Infantry Divisions and the ROK 1st Division, to advance quickly on the PVA/KPA positions and reach the Imjin River with all possible speed.

Operation Tomahawk was the other half of the plan. This operation was designed to drop the 187th RCT about 30 kilometres (19 mi) north of the then current front line. They did so, parachuting from over 120 C-119 Flying Boxcar and C-46 transport aircraft. When they landed they linked up with Task Force Growdon, which was made up of armored elements from the US 24th Infantry Division (United States)'s 6th Medium Tank Battalion and infantry elements from the US 3rd Infantry Division. The forces advanced to their goal, meeting weak resistance—mostly minefields—because the PVA/KPA had retreated before they got there. 136 of the PVA/KPA forces were killed in action, and 149 were captured during the operation. The 187th RCT suffered 19 fatalities and dozens of wounded.

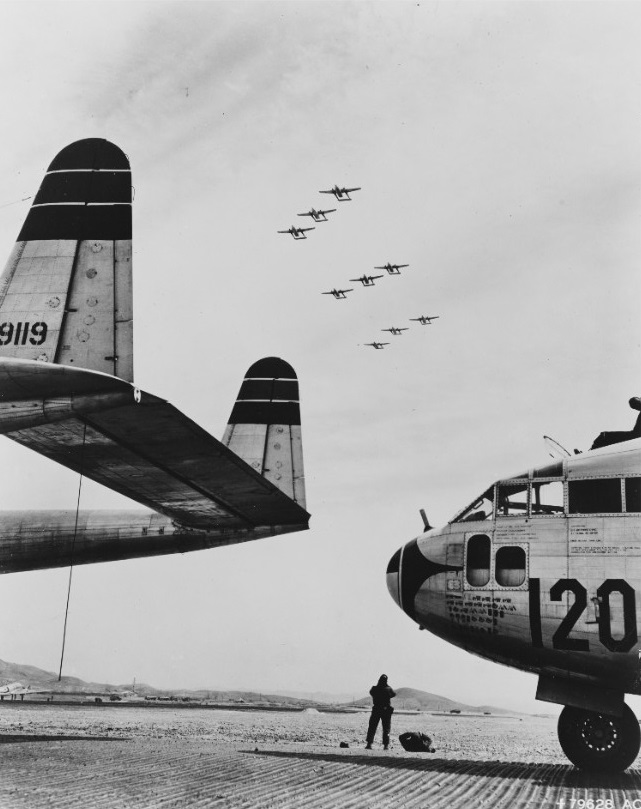
USAF C-119s at Taegu Air Base

One hundred twenty C-119s and C-46s dropped 3,437 paratroopers of the 187th RCT and 12 officers and men of the Indian Army 60th Parachute Field Ambulance (PFA) near Munsan-ni in the second largest airborne operation of the war. The 187th Regiment airborne were also known as "Rakkasans", a Japanese term translating to "falling parachute man". This marked the first time 105 mm howitzers and other heavy equipment had been successfully dropped. One C-119, possibly hit by enemy bullets, caught fire and crashed on the way back.

Operation Tomahawk was the second and last United States airborne operation during the Korean War. The United States Army would not conduct another full-scale combat jump until 1967 during the Vietnam War, known as Operation Junction City.
