= Attorney General Bowen =

Attorney General Bowen may refer to:

- Edward Bowen (politician) (1780–1866), Attorney-General for Lower Canada
- Lionel Bowen (1922–2012), Attorney General of Australia

== See also ==
- General Bowen (disambiguation)
