= Lester Hammond Jr. =

US Medal of Honor recipient (1931–1952)

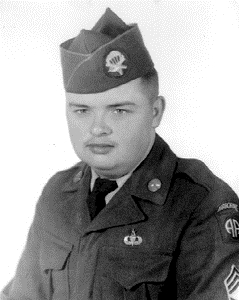
- Medal of Honor recipient
- Born: March 25, 1931; Wayland, Missouri
- Died: August 14, 1952 (aged 21) near Kumwha, Korea
- Burial place: Sunset Cemetery, Quincy, Illinois
- Military career
- Allegiance: United States
- Branch: United States Army
- Service years: 1948–1952
- Rank: Corporal
- Units: Company A, 187th Airborne Infantry Regiment
- Conflicts: Korean War (DOW)
- Awards: Medal of Honor; Purple Heart

Lester Hammond Jr. (March 25, 1931 – August 14, 1952) was a soldier in the U.S. Army during the Korean War. He joined the Army from Quincy, Illinois in 1948, and posthumously received the Medal of Honor for his actions on August 14, 1952.

== Medal of Honor citation ==
Rank and organization: Corporal, U.S. Army, Company A, 187th Airborne Regimental Combat Team

Place and date: Near Kumwha, Korea, August 14, 1952

Entered service at: Quincy, Ill. Born: March 25, 1931, Wayland, Mo

G.O. No.: 63, August 17, 1953

Citation:

Cpl. Hammond, a radio operator with Company A, distinguished himself by conspicuous gallantry and outstanding courage above and beyond the call of duty in action against the enemy. Cpl. Hammond was a member of a 6 man reconnaissance patrol which had penetrated approximately 3,500 yards into enemy-held territory. Ambushed and partially surrounded by a large hostile force, the small group opened fire, then quickly withdrew up a narrow ravine in search of protective cover. Despite a wound sustained in the initial exchange of fire and imminent danger of being overrun by the numerically superior foe, he refused to seek shelter and, remaining in an exposed place, called for artillery fire to support a defensive action. Constantly vulnerable to enemy observation and action, he coordinated and directed crippling fire on the assailants, inflicting heavy casualties and repulsing several attempts to overrun friendly positions. Although wounded a second time, he remained steadfast and maintained his stand until mortally wounded. His indomitable fighting spirit set an inspiring example of valor to his comrades and, through his actions, the onslaught was stemmed, enabling a friendly platoon to reach the beleaguered patrol, evacuate the wounded, and effect a safe withdrawal to friendly lines. Cpl. Hammond's unflinching courage and consummate devotion to duty reflect lasting glory on himself and uphold the finest traditions of the military service.

== See also ==
- List of Medal of Honor recipients
- List of Korean War Medal of Honor recipients
