= 31st Engineer Battalion =

Unit of the United States Army

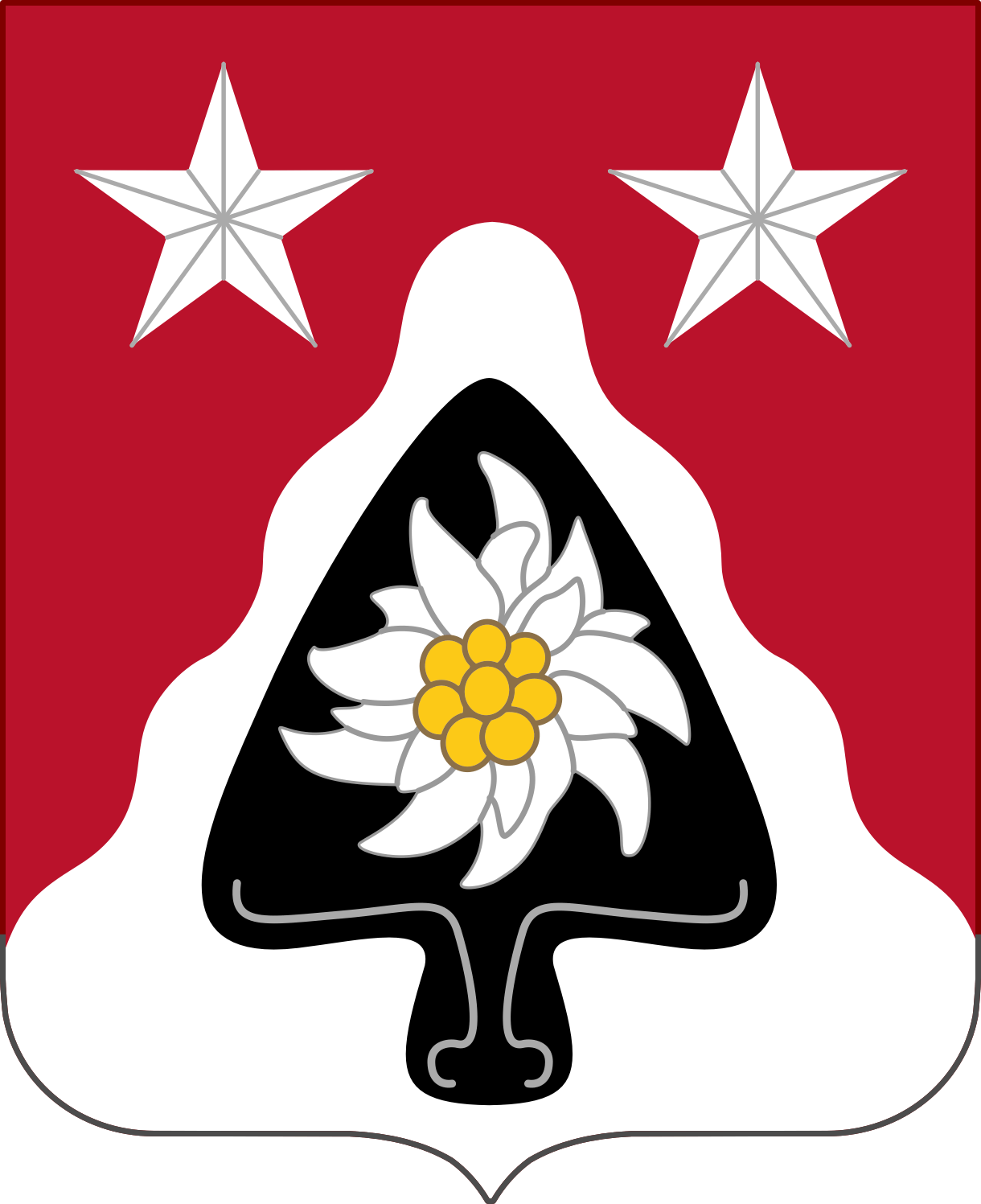
- Coat of arms
- Active: 1940
- Country: United States
- Branch: US Army Corps of Engineers
- Part of: 1st Engineer Brigade
- Garrison/HQ: Fort Leonard Wood
- Motto: Demonstramus

Insignia
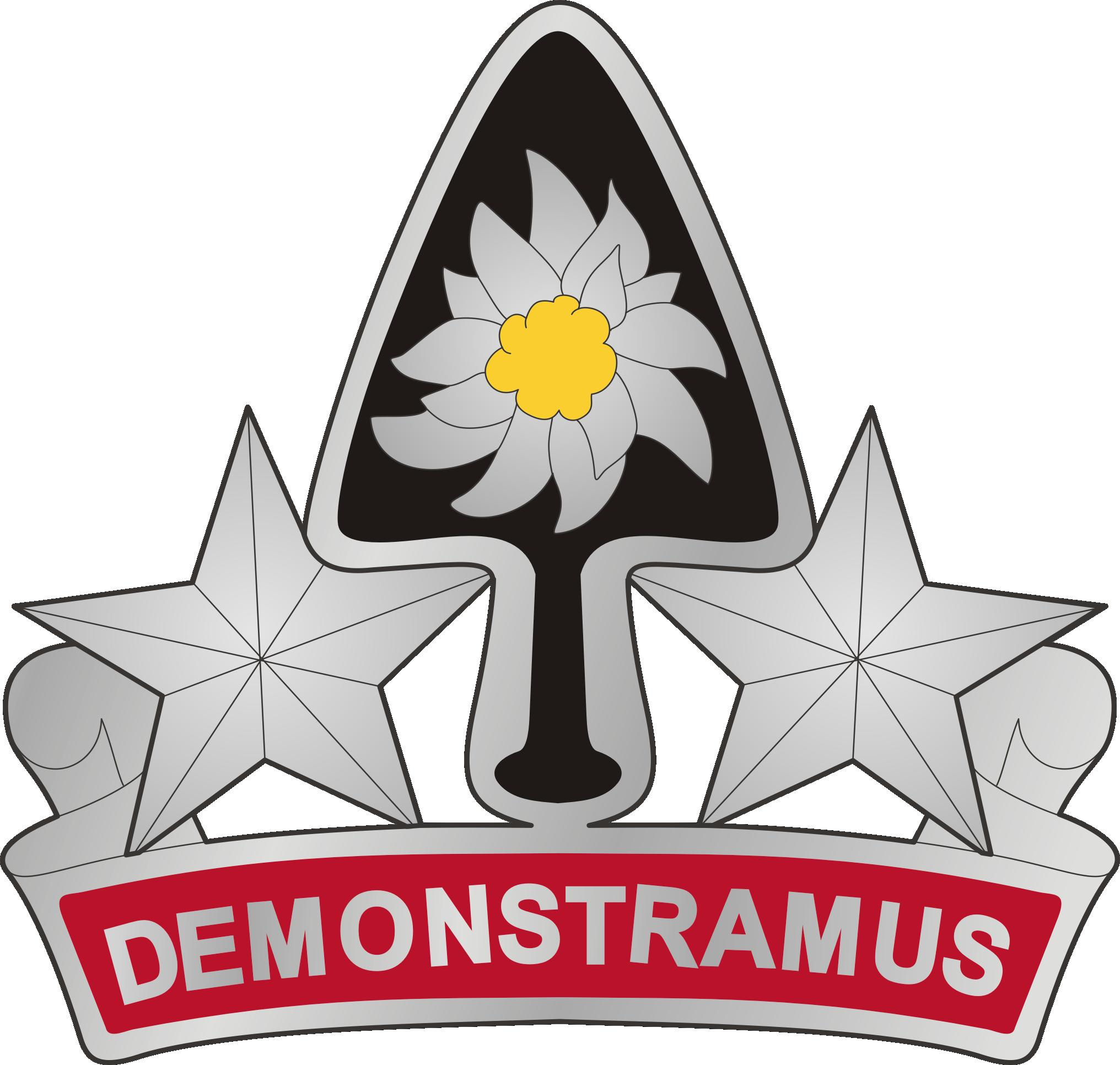
- Distinctive Unit Insignia

The 31st Engineer Battalion, known during World War II as the 31st Engineer Combat Battalion, is a combat Engineer Battalion in the U.S. Army

== History ==
=== Origin ===
The 31st Engineer Battalion of the United States Army was originally constituted as the 31st Engineer Company on 1 July 1940 and activated at Fort Belvoir, Virginia. The unit was reorganized, expanded and redesignated on 15 December 1941 as the 31st Engineer Combat Battalion. On 29 April 1942 the unit was reorganized and redesignated as the 1st Battalion, 31st Engineers (Combat), and then again on 1 August 1942 as the 31st Engineer Combat Regiment.

After being re-designated as the 31st Engineer Combat Regiment, the regiment was broken up on 22 March 1943 and its elements were then reorganized and redesignated as follows: 1st Battalion as the 31st Engineer Combat Battalion, Headquarters and Headquarters and Service Company as Headquarters and Headquarters Company, 1114th Engineer Combat Group, 2nd Battalion as the 241st Engineer Combat Battalion.

=== European Theater in WWII ===
The 31st Engineer Combat Battalion remained at Fort Belvoir until 10 June 1944 and then served for four months at Camp Butner, North Carolina. The 31st Engineer Combat Battalion departed New York Port of Embarkation on 22 October 1944 aboard the General William Black for overseas service. They arrived in England on 2 November 1944 and landed in France on 31 December 1944 and were assigned to Seventh Army. It then moved to Bouxwiller in the French Alsace and installed defense against a possible renewed German attack in the region.

The battalion entered Germany in late March 1945 and crossed the Rhine near Mannheim on the last day of that month. It encountered its toughest fighting of the war on 4–8 April as it sought to bridge the Neckar River near Heilbronn. The battalion then swung south, crossing the Danube at Ulm and entering Austria on 9 May. After serving for a time on occupation duty in Vienna, the 31st Sailed back from Le Havre, France, on 26 February 1946 and arrived in New York Port of Embarkation on 7 March 1946. Two days later, the 31st Engineer Combat Battalion inactivated at Camp Kilmer, New Jersey.

=== Korean War ===
On 10 March 1951, the battalion activated at Camp McCoy, Wisconsin, during the Korean War. It served there for two years before it was redesignated on 8 June 1953 as the 31st Engineer Battalion (Combat) and moved to Fort Carson, Colorado. On 15 December 1956, the battalion inactivated.

=== Vietnam ===
The unit was again activated on 17 June 1963 at Fort Chaffee, Arkansas. The battalion departed Fort Bliss, Texas for overseas service and arrived at Vung Tau, Vietnam on 5 May 1968, and was directed to Xuan Loc to back up and construct the Black Horse Base Camp for the 11th Armored Cavalry Regiment. The battalion was responsible for III CTZ airmobile equipment support and construction support under the 159th and 79th Engineer Groups just north of Saigon. The unit moved to Phước Vĩnh on 20 October 1968 and to Long Binh in mid-1971 where it remained until it departed Vietnam for return to the United States. After nearly four years of service in Vietnam, the battalion returned to Fort Lewis, Washington, and was inactivated there on 12 March 1972.

=== 1986 to present ===
On 30 September 1986, the "Second to None" 31st Engineer Battalion transferred to the United States Army and Doctrine Command; concurrently, Headquarters organized at Fort Leonard Wood, Missouri and redesignated the "We Demonstrate" 31st Engineer Battalion.

On 20 August 1990, the 132nd Engineer Brigade inactivated. The 31st Engineer Battalion then became part of the 1st Engineer Brigade.

From January to March 1991, the battalion began preparing Soldiers for Operation Desert Storm, and supported the mobilization of the 1st Battalion, 392nd Regiment, 98th Division (Training) based in New York State. The battalion was reassigned from the 1st Engineer Brigade to the 3rd Training Brigade on 6 May 1991. Along with the 35th and 589th Engineer Battalion, the 31st joined the five battalions of the 10th Infantry Regiment.

In January 1992, Delta Company was inactivated, and Echo Company was redesignated as Delta Company. In June 1993, Alpha Company was redesignated E/35th; Bravo and Charlie Companies turned provisional and fell under the control of the 35th Engineer Battalion on 1 October 1993. Delta Company inactivated with the battalion on 15 October 1993.

Today the 31st Engineer Battalion once again is based at Fort Leonard Wood, Missouri under the 1st Engineer Brigade.

== Lineage ==
Constituted 1 July 1940 in the Regular Army as the 31st Engineer Company and activated at Fort Belvoir, Virginia

- Reorganized and redesignated 15 December 1941 as the 31st Engineer Battalion
- Reorganized and redesignated 29 April 1942 as the 31st Engineers
- Redesignated 1 August 1942 as the 31st Engineer Combat Regiment

Regiment broken up 22 March 1943 and its elements reorganized and redesignated as follows-

- 1st Battalion as the 31st Engineer Combat Battalion
- (Headquarters and Headquarters and Service Company as Headquarters and Headquarters Company, 1114th Engineer Combat Group;
- 2d Battalion as the 241st Engineer Combat Battalion—hereafter separate lineages)

31st Engineer Combat Battalion inactivated 9 March 1946 at Camp Kilmer, New Jersey

- Activated 10 March 1951 at Camp McCoy, Wisconsin
- Reorganized and redesignated 8 June 1953 as the 31st Engineer Battalion
- Inactivated 15 December 1956 at Fort Carson, Colorado
- Activated 17 June 1963 at Fort Chaffee, Arkansas
- Inactivated 12 March 1972 at Fort Lewis, Washington

Headquarters transferred 30 September 1986 to the United States Army Training and Doctrine Command and activated at Fort Leonard Wood, Missouri

- Inactivated 2 October 1993 at Fort Leonard Wood, Missouri
- Activated 1 October 2001 at Fort Leonard Wood, Missouri
- Inactivated 1 October 2002 at Fort Leonard Wood, Missouri
- Activated 1 October 2005 at Fort Leonard Wood, Missouri

== Campaign participation credit ==
World War II: Rhineland; Ardennes-Alsace; Central Europe

Vietnam: Tet Counteroffensive; Counteroffensive, Phase IV; Counteroffensive, Phase V; Counteroffensive, Phase VI; Tet 69/Counteroffensive; Summer-Fall 1969; Winter-Spring 1970; Sanctuary Counteroffensive; Counteroffensive, Phase VII; Consolidation I; Consolidation II

== Decorations ==
- Valorous Unit Award, Streamer embroidered FISH HOOK
- Meritorious Unit Commendation (Army), Streamer embroidered VIETNAM 1968
- Republic of Vietnam Civil Action Honor Medal, First Class, Streamer embroidered VIETNAM 1968–1970
