= Paul Bucha =

United States Army Medal of Honor recipient

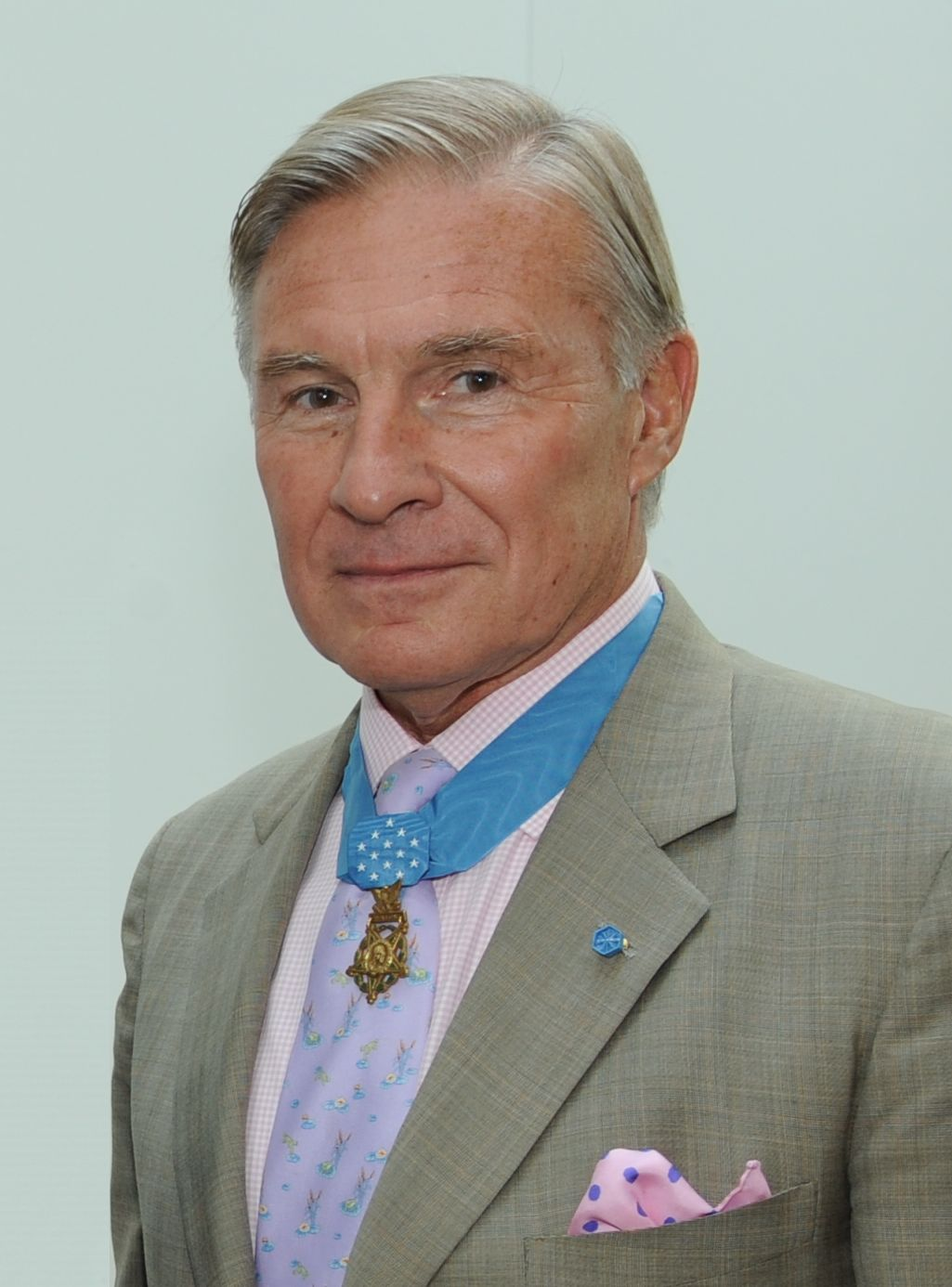
- Bucha in 2011
- Born: August 1, 1943; Washington, D.C., U.S.
- Died: July 31, 2024 (aged 80); West Haven, Connecticut, U.S.
- Burial place: West Point Cemetery, West Point, New York, U.S.
- Military career
- Allegiance: United States
- Branch: United States Army
- Service years: 1965–1972
- Rank: Captain
- Units: Company D, 3rd Battalion; 187th Infantry Regiment; 101st Airborne Division
- Conflicts: Vietnam War
- Awards: Medal of Honor; Bronze Star Medal with "V" device (2); Air Medal; Army Commendation Medal (2); Purple Heart

Paul William Bucha (August 1, 1943 – July 31, 2024) was an American Vietnam War veteran and a recipient of the Medal of Honor. He was a foreign policy adviser to Barack Obama's 2008 presidential campaign.

== Early life and education ==
Bucha was born on August 1, 1943, in Washington, D.C. He was of Croatian descent; his paternal grandfather immigrated to the United States from the Croatian town of Našice. He graduated from Ladue Horton Watkins High School in 1961. An all-American swimmer in high school, Bucha was offered athletic scholarships to several universities but turned them down and attended the United States Military Academy at West Point. After graduation he earned a Master of Business Administration at Stanford University before beginning his military career at Fort Campbell.

== Vietnam War and Medal of Honor ==
Bucha was sent to Vietnam in 1967 as a captain and commander of Company D, 3rd Battalion, 187th Infantry Regiment (Rakkasans). On March 16, 1968, he and his company of 89 men were dropped by helicopter southwest of Phước Vĩnh, in Bình Dương Province. The area was believed to be a North Vietnamese stronghold and Bucha's unit was tasked with seeking out and engaging the enemy forces. For two days Company D encountered light resistance as it cleared North Vietnamese positions. On the afternoon of March 18, the company's lead group of about twelve men stumbled upon a full North Vietnamese army battalion that had stopped to camp for the night. The lead element came under heavy fire and was pinned down. Bucha crawled toward them and destroyed a North Vietnamese bunker. He returned to the company perimeter and ordered a withdrawal to a more defensible position. Throughout the night he encouraged his men, distributed ammunition, and directed artillery and helicopter gunship fire. At one point he stood exposed and used flashlights to direct helicopters which were evacuating the wounded and bringing in supplies. The next morning, as the North Vietnamese forces withdrew, he led a party to rescue those soldiers who had been cut off from the rest of the company.

Once his tour in the Vietnam War ended in April 1970, Bucha returned to the United States and taught Political Science at West Point. It was during this time he learned he had been awarded the Medal of Honor for his actions in the battle near Phuoc Vinh. The medal was presented to him on May 14, 1970, by President Richard Nixon.

== Later life ==
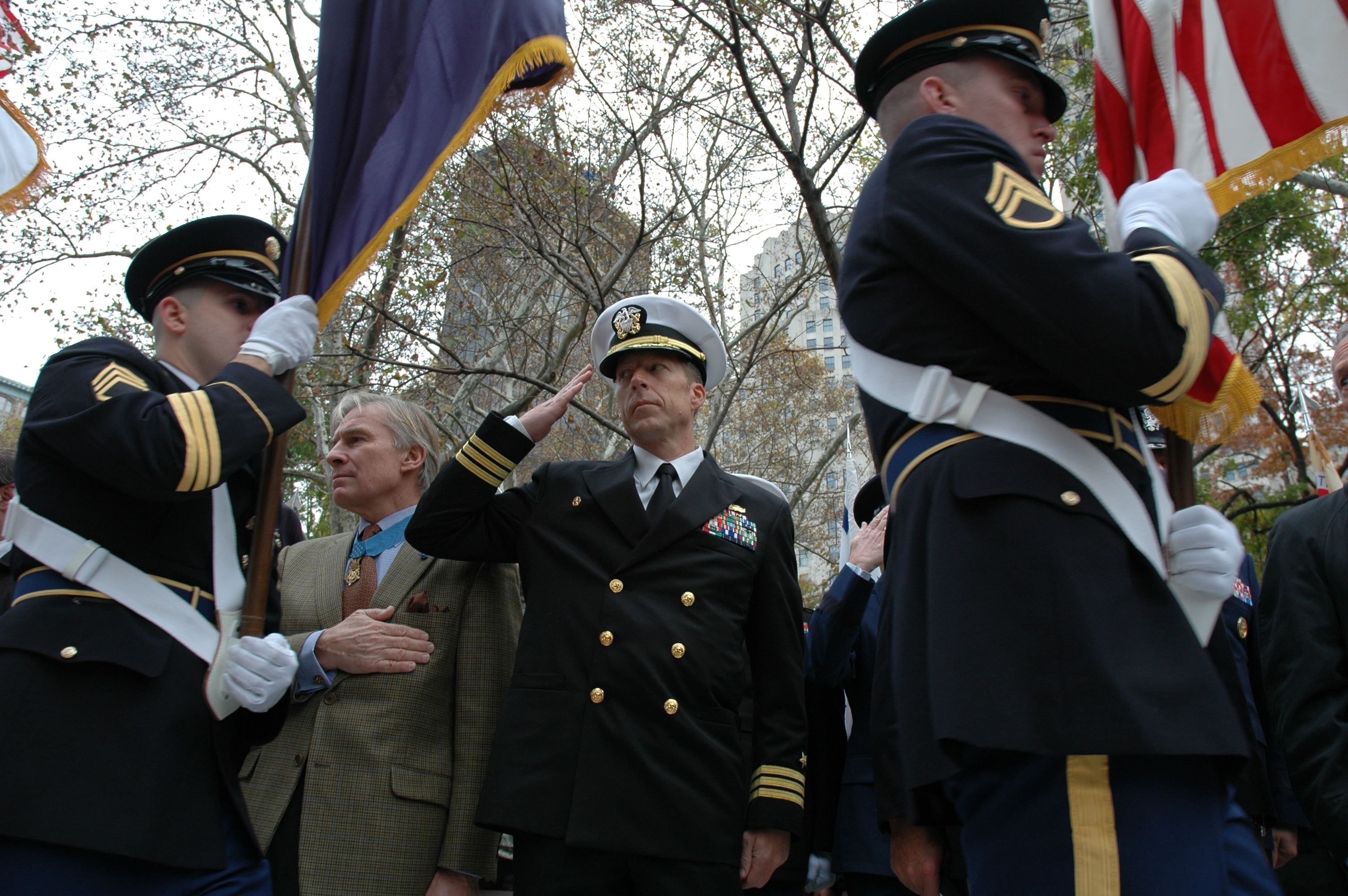
Bucha (2nd from left) at the 2009 New York City Veterans Day parade

Bucha left the army in 1972. He worked as chief of operations in Iran for Ross Perot's company, Electronic Data Systems (EDS). When several EDS employees were detained during the 1979 Iranian Revolution, he was involved in the effort to free them. He then started his own company, which found American partners for foreign investors. With a French real estate developer he formed a joint venture in real estate development which began the development of Port Liberté, New Jersey. He later worked as chairman of the board of Wheeling-Pittsburgh Steel Corporation and was president of the Congressional Medal of Honor Society. He sat on the Board of Directors to a number of organizations and companies, including Veterans Advantage, a Public Benefit Corporation that creates exclusive benefits and discounts for the military community, of which he has been an advisory board member since its founding by Lin and Scott Higgins in 2000.

Bucha was active in political affairs and campaigned for Barack Obama during the 2008 presidential election. He would serve Obama's 2008 Presidential campaign as a foreign policy adviser and appeared at rallies with other veterans. Bucha unsuccessfully ran as a Republican for the United States House of Representatives in New York's 19th Congressional District in 1994, losing the September 1994 Republican primary to Sue W. Kelly and coming in fourth place.

Bucha was an honorary member of the Rhode Island Commandery of the Military Order of Foreign Wars. Bucha married twice. His first marriage to Carolyn Maynard ended in divorce. He lived in Ridgefield, Connecticut, with his wife Cynthia, who he married in 1996. He had four children.

Bucha died from Alzheimer's disease at a hospital in West Haven, Connecticut, on July 31, 2024, the day before his 81st birthday. He is buried in West Point Cemetery on the grounds of the United States Military Academy, West Point, New York.

== Medal of Honor citation ==

Rank and organization: Captain, U.S. Army, Company D, 3d Battalion. 187th Infantry, 3d Brigade, 101st Airborne Division. Place and date: Near Phuoc Vinh, Binh Duong Province, Republic of Vietnam, 16- March 19, 1968. Entered service at: U.S. Military Academy, West Point, N.Y. Born: August 1, 1943, Washington, D.C.

For conspicuous gallantry and intrepidity in action at the risk of his life above and beyond the call of duty. Capt. Bucha distinguished himself while serving as commanding officer, Company D, on a reconnaissance-in-force mission against enemy forces near Phuoc Vinh. The company was inserted by helicopter into the suspected enemy stronghold to locate and destroy the enemy. During this period Capt. Bucha aggressively and courageously led his men in the destruction of enemy fortifications and base areas and eliminated scattered resistance impeding the advance of the company. On 18 March while advancing to contact, the lead elements of the company became engaged by the heavy automatic weapon, heavy machine gun, rocket propelled grenade, Claymore mine and small-arms fire of an estimated battalion-size force. Capt. Bucha, with complete disregard for his safety, moved to the threatened area to direct the defense and ordered reinforcements to the aid of the lead element. Seeing that his men were pinned down by heavy machine gun fire from a concealed bunker located some 40 meters to the front of the positions, Capt. Bucha crawled through the hail of fire to single-handedly destroy the bunker with grenades. During this heroic action Capt. Bucha received a painful shrapnel wound. Returning to the perimeter, he observed that his unit could not hold its positions and repel the human wave assaults launched by the determined enemy. Capt. Bucha ordered the withdrawal of the unit elements and covered the withdrawal to positions of a company perimeter from which he could direct fire upon the charging enemy. When 1 friendly element retrieving casualties was ambushed and cut off from the perimeter, Capt. Bucha ordered them to feign death and he directed artillery fire around them. During the night Capt. Bucha moved throughout the position, distributing ammunition, providing encouragement and insuring the integrity of the defense. He directed artillery, helicopter gunship and Air Force gunship fire on the enemy strong points and attacking forces, marking the positions with smoke grenades. Using flashlights in complete view of enemy snipers, he directed the medical evacuation of 3 air-ambulance loads of seriously wounded personnel and the helicopter supply of his company. At daybreak Capt. Bucha led a rescue party to recover the dead and wounded members of the ambushed element. During the period of intensive combat, Capt. Bucha, by his extraordinary heroism, inspirational example, outstanding leadership and professional competence, led his company in the decimation of a superior enemy force which left 156 dead on the battlefield. His bravery and gallantry at the risk of his life are in the highest traditions of the military service, Capt. Bucha has reflected great credit on himself, his unit, and the U.S. Army.

== See also ==
- List of Medal of Honor recipients for the Vietnam War
