= Operation Swarmer =

2006 military operation of the Iraq War

- Part of the Iraqi civil war and the Iraq War
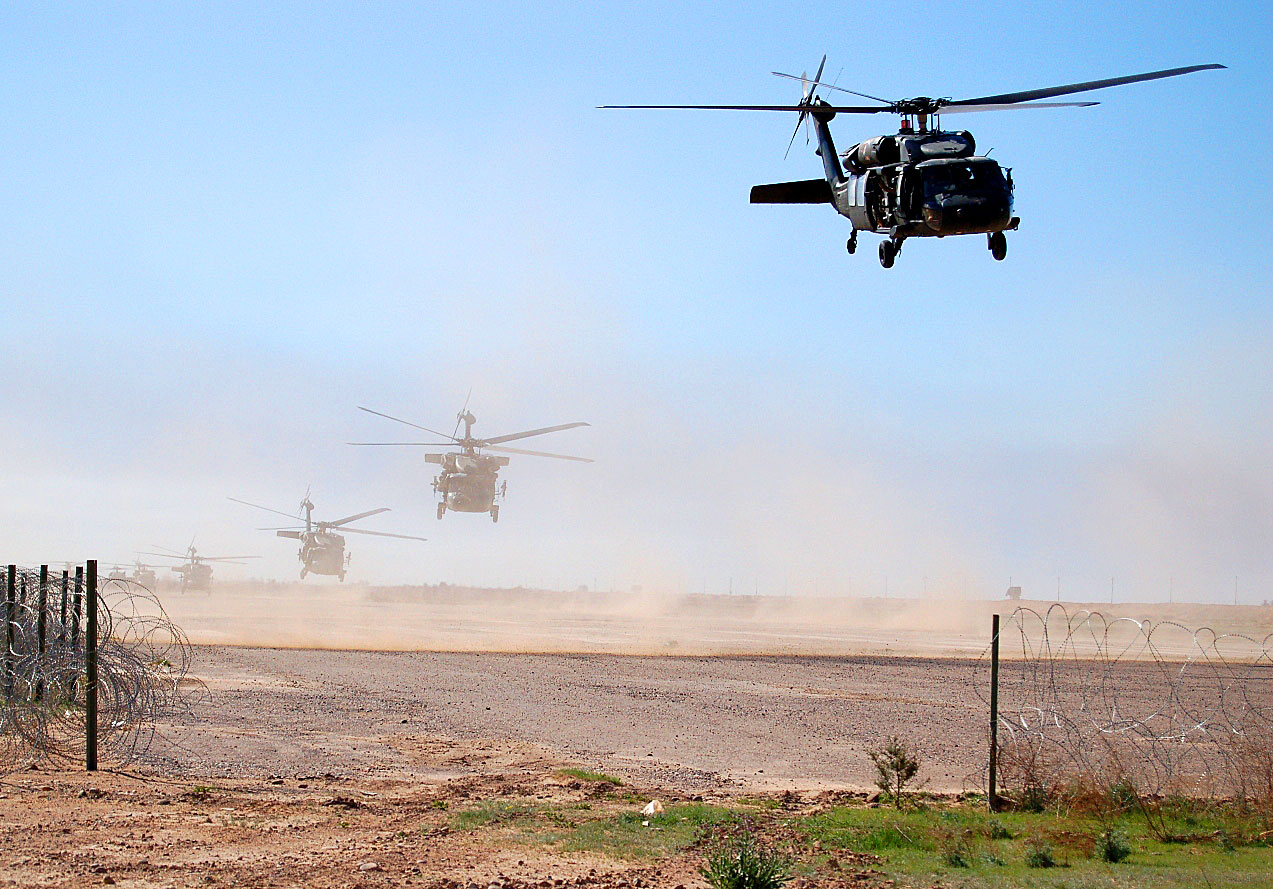
- Operation Swarmer begins with the largest air assault operation since the beginning of Operation Iraqi Freedom.
Date	16 March 2006 – 22 March 2006
Location	Samarra, Iraq
Result	Indecisive The operation resulted in 104 suspected insurgents currently being detained and questioned, and 24 caches discovered

Belligerents
United States; MNF–I (Iraq) Iraqi Army	Mujahideen Shura Council: Al-Qaeda in Iraq; Other Iraqi insurgents

Strength
More than 50 aircraft, 200 Vehicles and 1,500 troops	Unknown

Casualties and losses
None	48 Captured (17 were later released)

Operation Swarmer was a joint U.S-Iraqi air assault offensive targeting insurgents in Salahuddin province, near the central city of Samarra, Iraq.

According to the US military, it was the largest air assault in Iraq since the U.S. invasion in 2003. The area was a hotbed for insurgent activity including the kidnapping and killing of civilians and soldiers. Samarra was the site of the bombing of the revered Al-Askari Shiite Shrine on 22 February 2006, that set off a wave of sectarian killing that claimed almost 500 lives. Coalition forces said they had captured a number of weapons caches containing shells, explosives and military uniforms. The US military expected this operation to last several days. Iraqi Foreign Minister Hoshyar Zebari stated that insurgents were "trying to create another Fallujah". The Operation netted at least 48 suspects, of which about 17 were released. The U.S Military reports no significant resistance, and also says it achieved the tactical surprise factor it was seeking.

Other reports, however, have suggested that the lack of resistance may have been due to a lack of significant targets in the region. Time magazine's Brian Bennett reported that the area is a farming community with only 1,500 residents. Time also contested early television news reports that the operation was the largest use of air power since the 2003 invasion of Iraq, indicating that no air strikes had occurred. Bennett points out that the military term air assault refers specifically to moving troops into an area. Reporter Christopher Allbritton further reports that no fixed-wing aircraft were involved in the operation. However, the lack of fixed-wing aircraft and the use of airstrikes does not mean that the mission was not, by definition, an air assault.

== See also ==
- 2003 invasion of Iraq.
- Sectarian violence in Iraq.
- Al Askari Mosque bombing.
