= Richard G. Wilson =

United States Army Medal of Honor recipient

Richard Gene Wilson
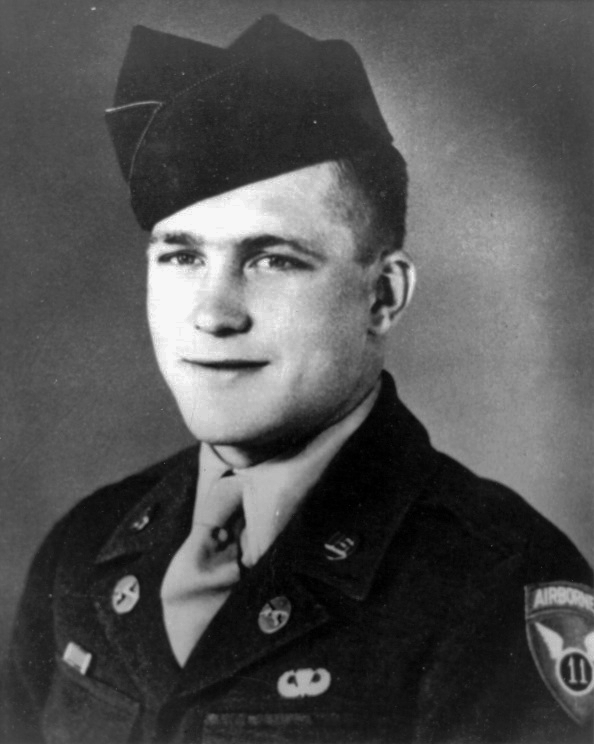
- Private First Class Richard Wilson
- Born: August 19, 1931; Marion, Illinois
- Died: October 21, 1950 (aged 19); Opa-ri, Korea
- Burial place: Cape County Park, Cape Girardeau, Missouri
- Military career
- Allegiance: United States of America
- Branch: United States Army
- Service years: 1948 – 1950
- Rank: Private First Class
- Unit: 187th Airborne Infantry Regiment
- Conflicts: Korean War • Battle of Yongju †
- Awards: Medal of Honor; Bronze Star; Purple Heart

Richard Gene Wilson (August 19, 1931 – October 21, 1950) was a United States Army soldier and a posthumous recipient of the U.S. military's highest decoration, the Medal of Honor, for his actions in the Korean War. A combat medic, Wilson was awarded the medal for attempting to rescue a wounded soldier at the Battle of Yongju.

== Early years and family ==
Wilson was born in Marion, Illinois, on August 19, 1931, to Albert and Alice Wilson. He had three brothers, Norman, Norris Dean, and Ronald, and three sisters, Rosemary, Shirley, and Jo Anne. The family moved to Cape Girardeau, Missouri, in 1939 where he attended May Greene School followed by Central High School. He was an avid sportsman and played right guard on Central's football team. After his junior year, Wilson left high school to join the Army; he enlisted on his seventeenth birthday, August 19, 1948.

Just before leaving for Korea, on August 29, 1950, Wilson married Yvonna Lea Fowler, a Central High School classmate.

== Military service ==
After completing basic training at Fort Knox, Kentucky, Wilson reported to Fort Sam Houston, Texas, where he was trained as a combat medic. He next attended Airborne School at Fort Benning, Georgia, graduating in May 1949. He was assigned to Fort Campbell, Kentucky, as a medic in the 11th Airborne Division.

Wilson served in Korea as a private first class with the 187th Airborne Infantry Regiment. On October 21, 1950, he was attached to Company I when the unit was ambushed while conducting a reconnaissance in force mission near Opa-ri. Wilson exposed himself to hostile fire in order to treat the many casualties and, when the company began to withdraw, he helped evacuate the wounded. After the withdrawal was complete, he learned that a soldier left behind and believed dead had been spotted trying to crawl to safety. Unarmed and against the advice of his comrades, Wilson returned to the ambush site in an attempt to rescue the wounded man. His body was found two days later, lying next to that of the man he had tried to save. For these actions, he was posthumously awarded the Medal of Honor on August 2, 1951.

== Honors and memorials ==
Several U.S. military buildings have been named in his honor, including the Richard G. Wilson Memorial Gymnasium in the Kanoka Barracks near Osaka, Japan; the Richard G. Wilson U.S. Army Reserve Center in Marion, Illinois, which was transferred to the Carbondale, Illinois USARC in August 2013; the PFC Richard G. Wilson Training Barracks at Fort Sam Houston, Texas, in 1986; the Richard G. Wilson Consolidated Troop Medical Clinic in Fort Leonard Wood, Missouri; the Wilson Theater in Fort Campbell, Kentucky, the Richard G. Wilson / Marion (Illinois) Police Department (formally the U.S. Army Reserve Center building) in May 2014 and the Richard G. Wilson US Postal Service Area Mail Processing Center in Cape Girardeau, MO in June 2004.

Among the memorials in his honor are "America's Medical Soldiers, Sailors, and Airmen in Peace and War" by Eloise Engle, 1967, and a memorial to Wilson in Cape County Park, 1988. Other structures named for him include Richard G. Wilson Elementary School in Fort Benning, Georgia, and a postal distribution center in Cape Girardeau, Missouri, dedicated in 2004.

== Medal of Honor citation ==
Wilson's official Medal of Honor citation reads:

Pfc. Wilson distinguished himself by conspicuous gallantry and intrepidity above and beyond the call of duty in action. As medical aid man attached to Company I, he accompanied the unit during a reconnaissance in force through the hilly country near Opari. The main body of the company was passing through a narrow valley flanked on 3 sides by high hills when the enemy laid down a barrage of mortar, automatic-weapons and small-arms fire. The company suffered a large number of casualties from the intense hostile fire while fighting its way out of the ambush. Pfc. Wilson proceeded at once to move among the wounded and administered aid to them oblivious of the danger to himself, constantly exposing himself to hostile fire. The company commander ordered a withdrawal as the enemy threatened to encircle and isolate the company. As his unit withdrew Private Wilson assisted wounded men to safety and assured himself that none were left behind. After the company had pulled back he learned that a comrade previously thought dead had been seen to be moving and attempting to crawl to safety. Despite the protests of his comrades, unarmed and facing a merciless enemy, Pfc. Wilson returned to the dangerous position in search of his comrade. Two days later a patrol found him lying beside the man he returned to aid. He had been shot several times while trying to shield and administer aid to the wounded man. Pfc. Wilson's superb personal bravery, consummate courage and willing self-sacrifice for his comrades reflect untold glory upon himself and uphold the esteemed traditions of the military service.

== Awards and Decorations ==

Badge	Combat Medical Badge		
1st row	Medal of Honor		Bronze Star Medal
2nd row	Purple Heart	Army Good Conduct Medal	National Defense Service Medal
3rd row	Korean Service Medal with 1 Campaign star	United Nations Service Medal Korea	Korean War Service Medal Retroactively Awarded, 2003
Unit awards	Presidential Unit Citation		Korean Presidential Unit Citation

11th Airborne Division Insignia

== See also ==
- List of Korean War Medal of Honor recipients
