= Frank S. Bowen =

United States Army general (1905–1976)

Frank S. Bowen Jr.
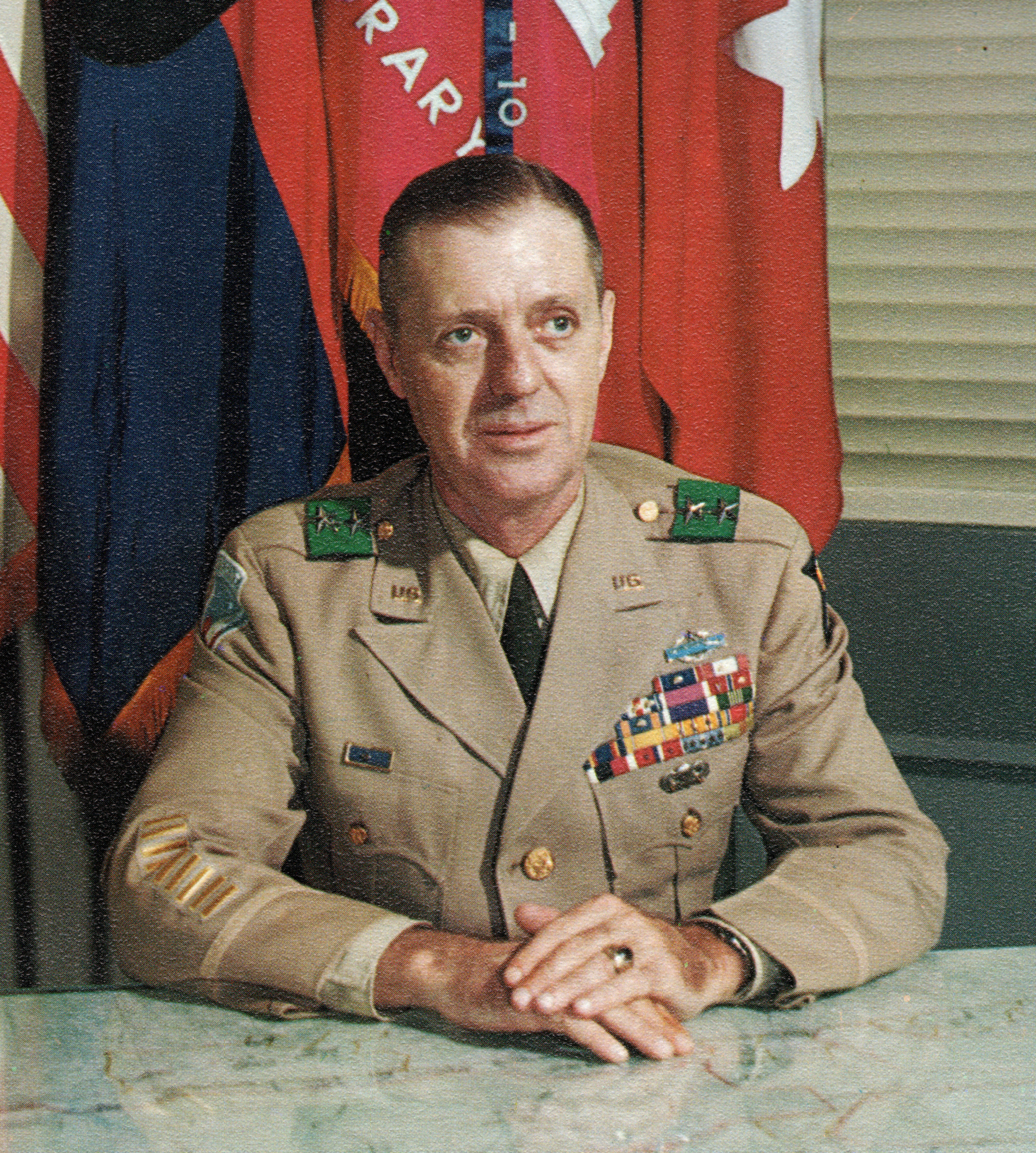
- Bowen as 101st Airborne Division Commander c. 1956
- Born: March 4, 1905; Fort McKinley, Manila, Philippines
- Died: September 24, 1976 (aged 71); Moncrief Army Hospital, Columbia, South Carolina
- Spouse: Elizabeth Kelly Bowen
- Military career
- Allegiance: United States
- Branch: United States Army
- Service years: 1926–1964
- Rank: Major General
- Commands: XII Corps; Military Assistance Advisory Group China; 101st Airborne Division; 6th Armored Division; 187th Airborne Infantry Regiment
- Conflicts: World War II; Korean War
- Awards: Distinguished Service Cross (2); Army Distinguished Service Medal (3); Silver Star (4); Legion of Merit; Bronze Star Medal; Air Medal; Purple Heart; Army Commendation Ribbon; American Presidential Unit Citation; Yangtze Patrol (Navy); Asiatic Pacific with Arrowhead; Korean Service with Arrowhead; WWII Victory Ribbon

Frank Sayles Bowen Jr. (March 4, 1905 – September 24, 1976) was a United States Army major general who served as commander of the 187th Airborne Infantry Regiment during the Korean War.

== Early life and education ==
Frank Sayles Bowen was born at Fort McKinley, Philippine Islands, 4 March 1905. His father, Colonel Frank S. Bowen, was a graduate of United States Military Academy for the Class of 1900. His mother, Mildred Alford Bowen, was born in Tennessee and was a resident of Columbia, South Carolina.

== Military career ==
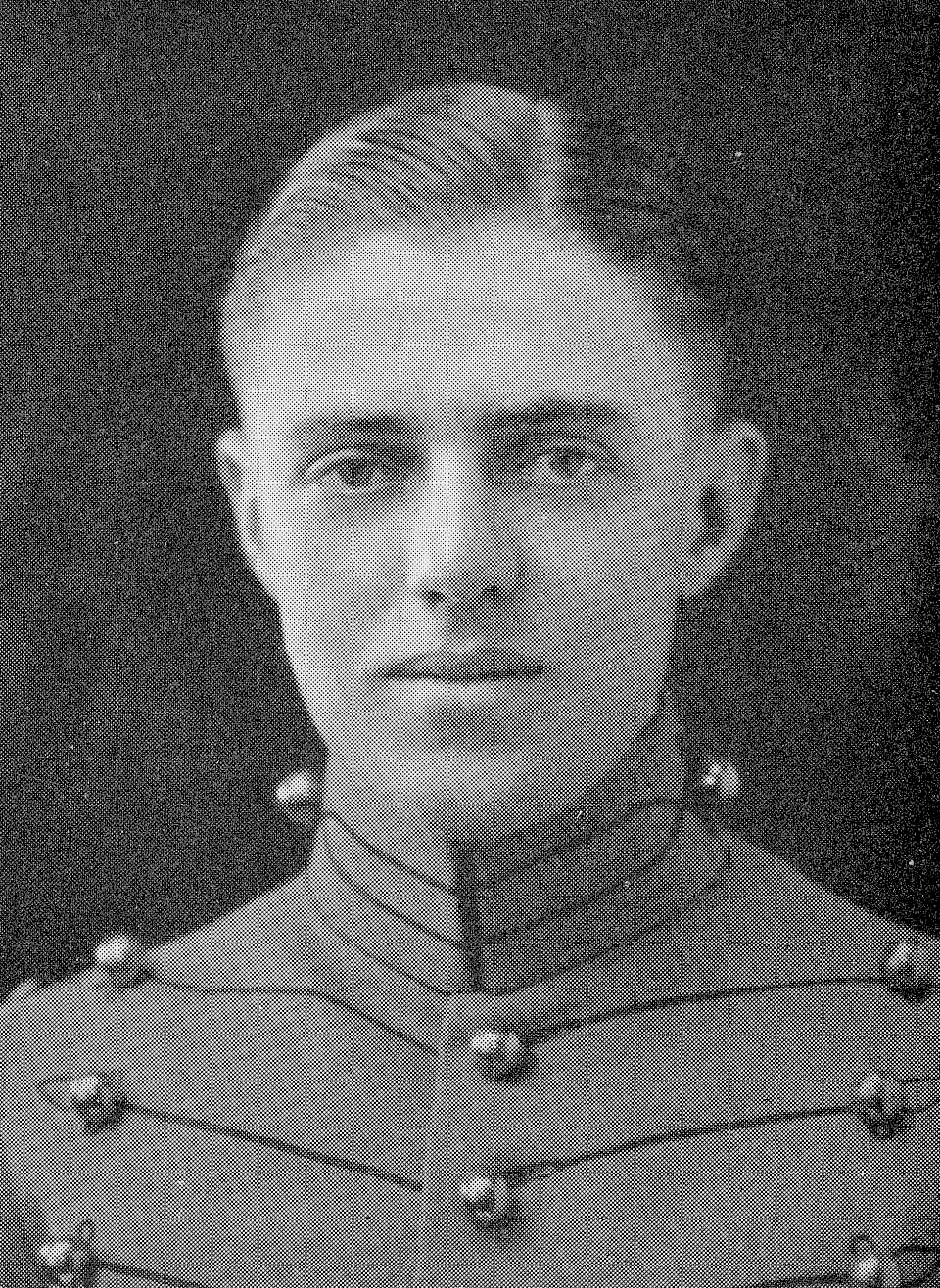
At West Point in 1926

Bowen attended the United States Military Academy at West Point, graduating in 1926. From mid-1939 to mid-1947, his career tracked that of his mentor Robert L. Eichelberger. He served under Eichelberger in the 30th Infantry Regiment and, in 1940, he served as aide-de‐camp to Eichelberger while the latter was superintendent of West Point. With the United States entry into World War II, Eichelberger took command of the 77th Infantry Division with Bowen as his Personnel Officer (G-1). Eichelberger soon took command of I Corps with Bowen serving as assistant Operation Officer and then Operations Officer (G-3).

Colonel Bowen would receive his first Distinguished Service Cross for his actions on 12 December 1942 during the Battle of Buna–Gona. In August 1944, Eichelberger was given command of the newly formed Eighth United States Army and Bowen joined him as G-3. Bowen was promoted to the temporary rank of brigadier general late in the war. After the war, he reverted to his previous rank.

Bowen served as commander of the 187th Airborne Infantry Regiment and led the unit in the Battle of Yongju, Operation Tomahawk and Operation Courageous during the Korean War. He served as commander of the 101st Airborne Division in 1955 and, that August, he became commander of Fort Jackson and remained in command of the base until August 1956. In September 1956 he became head of Military Assistance Advisory Group China in Taiwan, personally befriending Chang Kai-Shek, and remained in that post until July 1958.

Bowen retired from the army in 1964 and moved to Newberry, South Carolina with his wife in a house next to his nephew and protégé, Chaplain Colonel Lawrence A. Kelly Jr. After retiring from the Army in 1964, he served as executive director of the South Carolina Traffic Safety Council and also headed the South Carolina chapter of the American Cancer Society.

He died at Moncrief Army Hospital, Columbia, South Carolina on 24 September 1976.

He was married to Elizabeth Kelly Bowen and their son, US Army Colonel Frank S. Bowen III also graduated from West Point.
