= Munsan =

Coordinates: 37°51′11″N 126°47′05″E

- eup
- Interactive map of Munsan
- Country: South Korea
- Province: Gyeonggi Province

Area
  - Total: 47.37 km^{2} (18.29 sq mi)

Population (2003)
  - Total: 28,880
  - Density: 609.7/km^{2} (1,579/sq mi)

Korean name
- Hangul: 문산읍
- Hanja: 文山邑
- RR: Munsan-eup
- MR: Munsan-ŭp

Munsan is a town of Paju, Gyeonggi Province, South Korea. It lies on the south bank of the Imjin River, close to the edge of the Demilitarized Zone and near Panmunjom and the Joint Security Area.

== History ==
Munsan has a heavy military presence because of the proximity to the South Korean border with North Korea. At the time of the Korean War it was known as Munsa-an-ni. Munsan was the scene of Operation Tomahawk on 23 March 1951, an attempt by U.S. airborne troops to cut off retreating People's Volunteer Army and North Korean army forces.
