= Phước Vĩnh Base Camp =

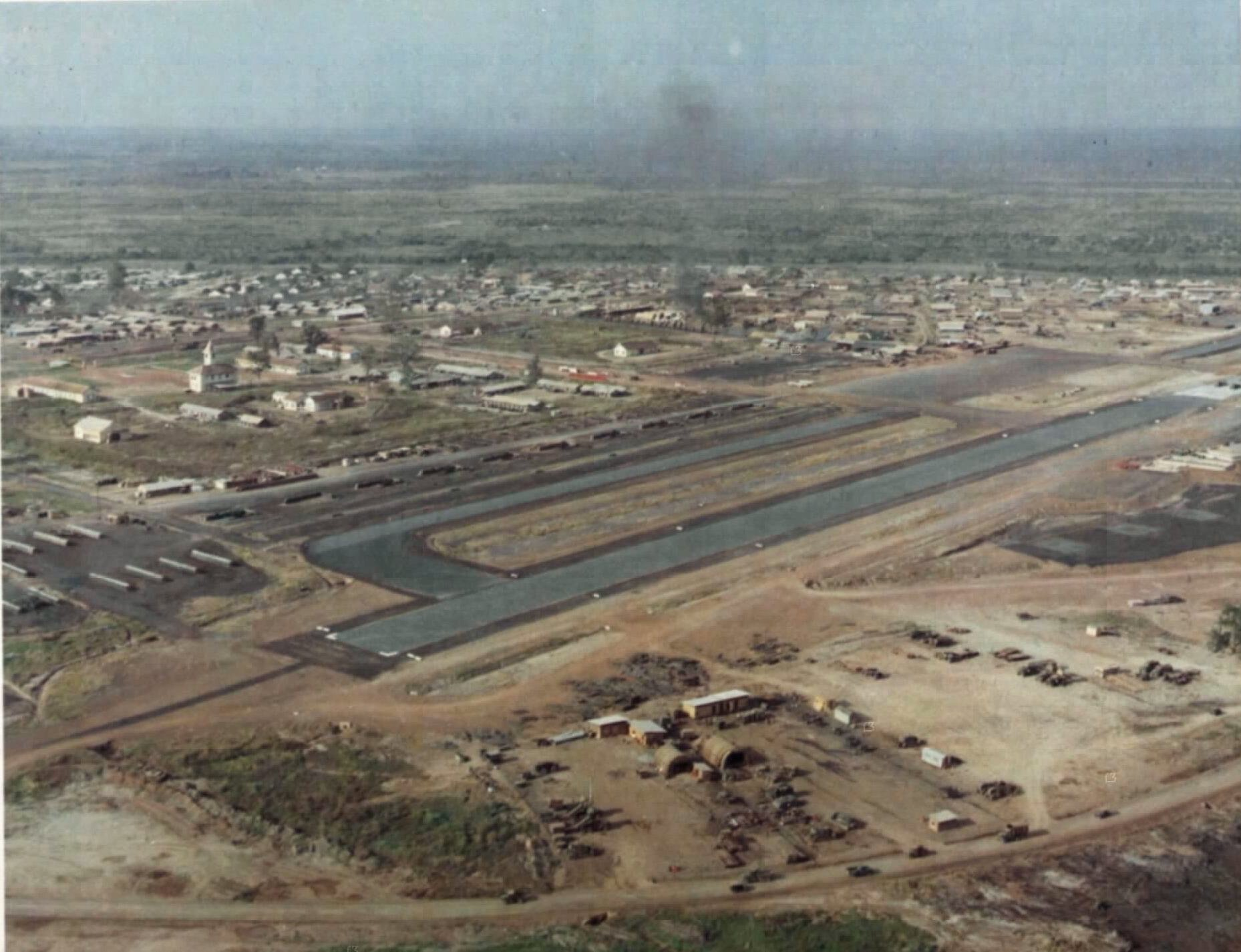
- An aerial view of the Phuoc Vinh Base Camp in February 1969, showing the asphalt runway

Site information
- Type: Army Base

Location
- Coordinates: 11°17′53″N 106°47′43″E

Site history
- Built: 1965
- In use: 1965-present
- Battles/wars: Vietnam War

Garrison information
- Occupants: 1st Brigade, 1st Infantry Division; 506th Infantry Regiment; 1st Cavalry Division

Phước Vĩnh Airfield
- IATA: none; ICAO: none

Summary
- Elevation AMSL: 180 ft (55 m)

Runways
Direction	Length		Surface
Direction	ft	m	Surface
09/27	3,700	1,128	asphalt

Phước Vĩnh Base Camp (also known as Phước Vĩnh Combat Base) is a former U.S. Army base north of Biên Hòa in southern Vietnam.

== History ==
The base was established in October 1965 and was located approximately 35 km north of Biên Hòa in Phước Thành Province.

The 1st Brigade, 1st Infantry Division comprising:

- 1st Battalion, 2nd Infantry Regiment
- 1st Battalion, 16th Infantry Regiment (December 1965-November 1966)
- 1st Battalion, 26th Infantry Regiment
- 1st Battalion, 28th Infantry Regiment
- 2nd Battalion, 28th Infantry Regiment (December 1965-November 1966)

was based at Phước Vĩnh from December 1965 until February 1968.

The 506th Infantry Regiment moved to the base in December 1967 as part of Operation Uniontown and remained there until October 1968.

In November 1968 the 1st Cavalry Division moved here from Camp Evans as part of Operation Liberty Canyon and would remain based here until April 1971.

Other units stationed at Phước Vĩnh included:

- 5th Special Forces Group Detachment A-412
- 11th Aviation Company (July 1965-April 1971)
- 6th Battalion, 27th Artillery (November 1965-June 1966, January 1968)
- 31st Engineer Battalion (July 1968-mid 1971)
- 1st Squadron, 9th Cavalry
  - Headquarters Troop
  - Charlie Troop
    - Red Platoon (Gun) (AH-1G Cobra/OH-6A Cayuse)
    - Blue Platoon (Lift) (UH-1H Iroquois)

== Current use ==
The base appears to remain in use by the People's Army of Vietnam.

== Accidents and incidents ==
- 12 November 1968, two UH-1H helicopters from the 227th Assault Helicopter Company collided over the airfield causing one (#66-16983) to crash killing all four passengers and crew
