= Women in combat =

Role of women in military combat

World map indicating restrictions of servicewomen from operational positions and combat roles (2024). Color gradient ranges from dark green (No restrictions) to red (prohibition from both combat roles and handling heavy military equipment).

Women in combat refers to female military personnel assigned to combat positions. The role of women in the military has varied across the world's major countries throughout history with several views for and against women in combat. Over time countries have generally become more accepting of women fulfilling combat roles.

== History ==
Women have fought in combat roles in different societies throughout history.

In Ancient History, a significant number of women in Scythian and Sarmatian societies participated in combat, potentially serving as a source of inspiration for Ancient Greek myths of the Amazons. In Ancient Greece, several women were said to have participated in the Trojan War, including Epipole of Carystus and Penthesilea. The Greek work Tractatus de mulieribus told the stories of 14 women distinguished in war.

In Ancient Macedonia, Cynane, half-sister to Alexander the Great, earned recognition for her victories on the battlefield. In Ancient Britain, several women were said to have ruled after prevailing in combat by Geoffrey of Monmouth, such as Cordelia of Britain and Queen Gwendolen. Queen Boudica has been a famous cultural symbol in Britain for her fight against the Romans. In Ancient Persia, Pantea Arteshbod served as Lieutenant Commander in the army of Cyrus the Great and Mania was said to have never been defeated in battle. In Ancient China, Fu Hao was one of the most powerful generals during the Shang dynasty. In Ancient Vietnam, the Trưng sisters became regarded as national heroes after rebelling against Chinese rule, with women also leading later rebellions against Chinese rule, such as Lady Triệu.

In the Medieval era, Joan of Arc became regarded as a national hero of France for her role in the Hundred Years' War. In Wales, Gwenllian ferch Gruffydd led a revolt against the Normans. Women were active as Viking warriors and gave rise of tales of shieldmaidens. The Rise of Islam saw a number of prominent women in combat, such as Nusaybah bint Ka'ab, Khawlah bint al-Azwar, and Ghazala. In Naranjo, Lady Six Sky launched a number of successful military campaigns. Toltec queen Xochitl led a battalion of women in a civil war. Princess Yennenga founded the Mossi Kingdoms. In early modern India, there were several prominent women who fought in combat, including Chand Bibi, Tarabai, Mai Bhago, and Rani of Jhansi.

During the First World War, Olena Stepaniv became the first woman officer in the Ukrainian army. She was the khorunzha of the Ukrainian Sich Riflemen. After the February Revolution, Russia used one all-female combat unit. Thousands of women fought in combat and rearguard roles in the Spanish Civil War.

During World War II, hundreds of thousands of British, German and Soviet women fought in combat roles in anti-aircraft units, where they fired guns and shot down thousands of enemy airplanes. In the Soviet Union, there was large-scale use of women near the front as medical staff and political officers. The Soviets also set up all-female sniper units and combat fighter planes. Women also played combat roles in resistance movements in the Soviet Union, Spain and Yugoslavia.

Battling Hamas on October 7, 2023, a group of all-women Israeli tank operators became "the first female armored crews in Israel, and perhaps the world, to participate in active battle."

== Countries and regions ==
=== Australia ===
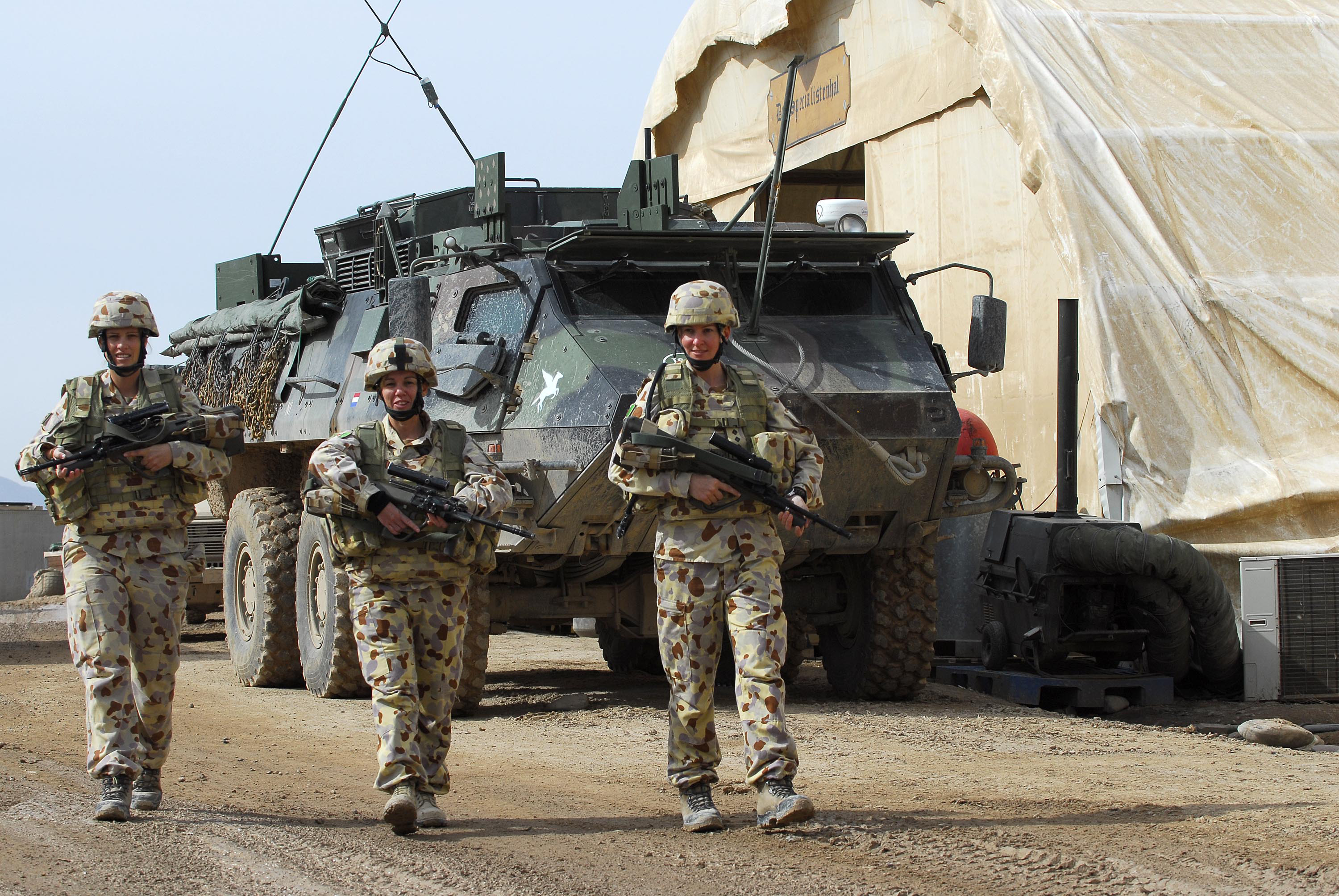
Female Australian soldiers in Afghanistan

The Australian military began a five-year plan to open combat roles to women in 2011. Front line combat roles opened in January 2013. The positions women will now be able to fill are: Navy Ordnance disposal divers, airfield and ground defense guards, infantry, artillery and armored units. Australia is one of nineteen countries which includes women in its direct combat forces. During Australia's participation in World War II, the Australian military created a sub-branch of each of its armed forces specifically for females. In 1977, the Royal Australian Air Force was the first Australian service to fully integrate women. The Australian Army was next, in 1979, followed by the Royal Australian Navy in 1985. Servicewomen's combat restrictions were eased beginning in 1990. In 2011, Defence Minister Stephen Smith announced that the Australian Cabinet had lifted all gender-based restrictions for women in combat.

=== Canada ===
Women have been an important component of the military of Canada. However, it was not until Canada's Charter of Rights and Freedom was enacted in 1982 that the Canadian Armed Forces were required to consider the equality of women in the services and to permit them for all military roles. It took exactly 7 years, until 1989, for all combat roles to finally be officially open to women in Canada. That same year, in 1989, the Canadian Human Rights Commission gave the Canadian Forces 10 years to meet a specific quota for women employed in the combat military trades. Although the Canadian Human Rights Commission had an exception to exclude women from serving on submarines, it was eventually lifted by the Royal Canadian Navy on March 8, 2000 and roles opened in 2001.

In 1998, the Canadian Forces embarked on a series of initiatives aimed at recruiting more women into the combat trades. While attrition and abuse remains an issue, with significantly higher rates of women leaving their military careers than men, the introduction of women into the combat arms has increased the potential recruiting pool by about 100%.

Jennie Carignan is the world's first-ever woman to become a combat general. In June 2016, she was promoted to the highest rank achieved by a Canadian woman from the combat-arms trades. Although there were other Canadian female generals in the past, their roles were limited to non-combat disciplines such as intelligence, medicine, combat support or administration. Combat roles have been open to women and female representation in the CAF has increased from 1.4 percent in 1965 to 15.3 percent as of January 2018. Numerically, this represents 14,434 women out of a total combined CAF membership of 93,578. As of February 2018, the total representation of women who served in combat arms (crewman, artillery, artilleryman, infantryman, infantry, engineer, combat engineer, and armoured) was 4.3%. During her career, Jennie Carignan has advocated for women into combat roles and urged the military to foster a better environment for women recruits.

=== Denmark ===
In 1988, Denmark created a policy of "total inclusion" following combat trials which they explored how women fight on the front lines. All positions in military were open to women, although as of 2013, no women had fulfilled the physical requirements of the Special Operations Forces.

In 2026, Denmark began mandatory conscription for all women and men over the age of 18, with standard service time of 4 to 11 months.

=== Finland ===
Men are required to enlist whereas for women it is voluntary. According to the Finnish Defence Forces, more than 14,000 women have voluntarily served in Finland. If women do choose to enlist, they are allowed to train for combat roles. As of 2026, there are no restrictions for women in the Finnish combat.

=== France ===
Women comprise nearly one-fifth of the military in France. Women can serve in all areas of the military. They have served on submarines, including nuclear submarines, since 2014.

=== Germany ===
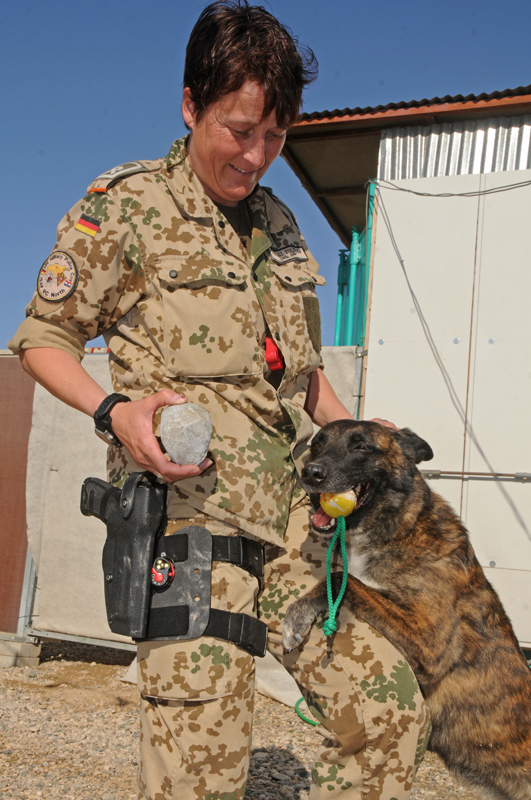
A German military dog handler in Afghanistan during 2009

In 2001, Germany opened all combat units to women. This greatly increased recruitment for female soldiers. Since 2001, the number of women in the German Armed Forces has tripled. By 2009, 800 female soldiers were serving in combat units.

=== India ===
India began recruiting women to non-medical positions in the armed forces in 1992.

In 2007 on 19 January, the United Nations first all female peacekeeping force made up of 105 Indian policewomen was deployed to Liberia.

In 2014, India's army had 3 % women, the Navy 2.8 % and the Air Force performed best with 8.5 % women among their officers.

In 2015 India opened new combat air force roles for women as fighter pilots, adding to their role as helicopter pilots in the Indian Air Force.

In 2020, the Supreme Court of India has ordered the Centre to ensure that women officers are given a permanent commission (PC) in the Army while adding that the officers will now be eligible for command posting. The court stated that all terms of appointments of women officers shall be the same as their male counterparts.

=== Israel ===
According to the Israel Defense Forces, 535 female Israeli soldiers had been killed in combat operations between the period 1962–2016 (this figure does not include the dozens of female soldiers killed in Israeli service prior to 1962). In 2014, the IDF said that fewer than 4 percent of women are in combat positions such as infantry, artillery units, fighter pilots, etc. Rather, they are concentrated in "combat-support".

In spite of this, women in ground combat positions are typically only deployed to guard duties in relatively quiet areas. Women are excluded from frontline infantry brigades which are actively deployed into combat zones. Female infantry combatants are limited to three mixed-gender infantry battalions (the Caracal, Lions of the Jordan, and Bardelas battalions) which are deployed along Israel's border with Egypt, the Jordan Valley, and the Arava region to guard against infiltration and smuggling attempts, the IDF's Oketz K9 unit, the Combat Intelligence Collection Corps, and the Search and Rescue Unit of the Home Front Command. Although they are expected to respond if a combat situation breaks out during operational activity, female infantry soldiers are not actively deployed into war zones. They are also subjected to lighter physical training standards than male soldiers. Female tank crews are limited to the Border Defense Array, in tanks guarding the borders with Egypt and Jordan, and are not part of regular armored units that are deployed into war zones. Their sole expectation as combatants is to return fire from a stationary position if engaged.

The Israeli Air Force allows women to serve as pilots alongside men in all roles since the ban on women serving as pilots was lifted in 1995, though the IAF's combat pilots are still overwhelmingly male. By 2014, 38 women had been accepted as pilots into the Israeli Air Force since 1995, including 3 combat pilots and 16 combat navigators.

=== Iraqi Kurdistan and Rojava ===
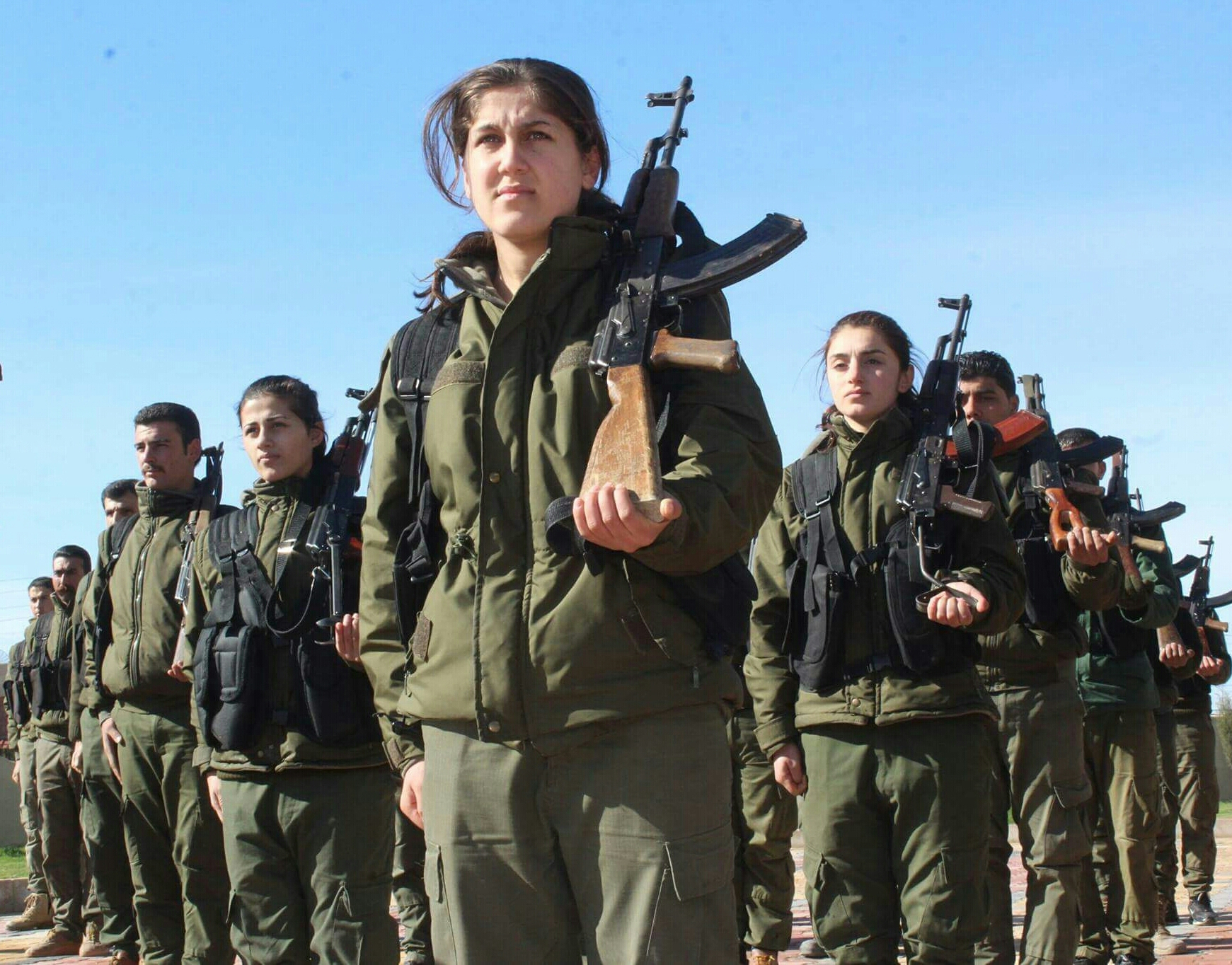
Members of the YPJ, alongside their male YPG counterparts

Kurdish women have played a major role in militias fighting ISIL, including in combat roles. The Women's Protection Units in Rojava is a pre-eminent example, constituting an estimated 40% of fighting forces. The YPJ operates as an autonomous organisation for co-ordinating women's defense in north-eastern Syria.

In Iraqi Kurdistan, many women serve in the Peshmerga and are seen as equal to their male counterparts. Most women serve within the Zerevani. the regional gendarmerie/paramilitary police.

=== New Zealand ===
In 1940, the Women's War Service Auxiliary (WWSA) was formed to recruit women for the armed forces during World War II. During its peak in 1944, 4,600 women were serving in New Zealand and overseas. WWSA was renamed to the New Zealand Women's Royal Army Corps (WRAC) in 1952. WRAC was disbanded and incorporated into the mainstream armed forces in July 1977, serving alongside men. However, some restrictions remained in place until 2007 which kept women out of some combat-related roles and training opportunities.

In 2024, women represent just over 20% of the NZDF Regular Force.

=== Norway ===
In 1985, Norway became the first country to allow women to serve on its submarines. The first female commander of a Norwegian submarine was Solveig Krey in 1995. Norway was, along with Israel, first to allow women to serve in all combat roles in the military in 1988. In 2015, Norway became the first nation in the world to conscript women for mandatory military service on the same formal conditions as men.

=== Pakistan ===
Women in the Pakistan Armed Forces are the female soldiers who serve in the Pakistan Armed Forces. Women have been taking part in Pakistani military since 1947 after the establishment of Pakistan. There are currently around 4,000 women who are serving in the Pakistan Armed Forces. In 2006, the first women fighter pilots batch joined the combat aerial mission command of PAF.

=== Sri Lanka ===
Female personnel of all three services play an active part in ongoing operations. However, there are certain limitations in 'direct combat' duties such as special forces, pilot branch, naval fast attack squadrons.

=== Sweden ===
Women have been able to serve in most military positions, including combat since 1983. The exception was tactical air service (pilot) and various submarine positions, which opened up in 1989. Since 2018, Sweden also conscripts women on the same (mandatory) terms as men. As of 2018, women constituted 15% of the selected conscripts and 7% of the professional military officers (however numbers were much higher on temporary positions).

=== Turkey ===
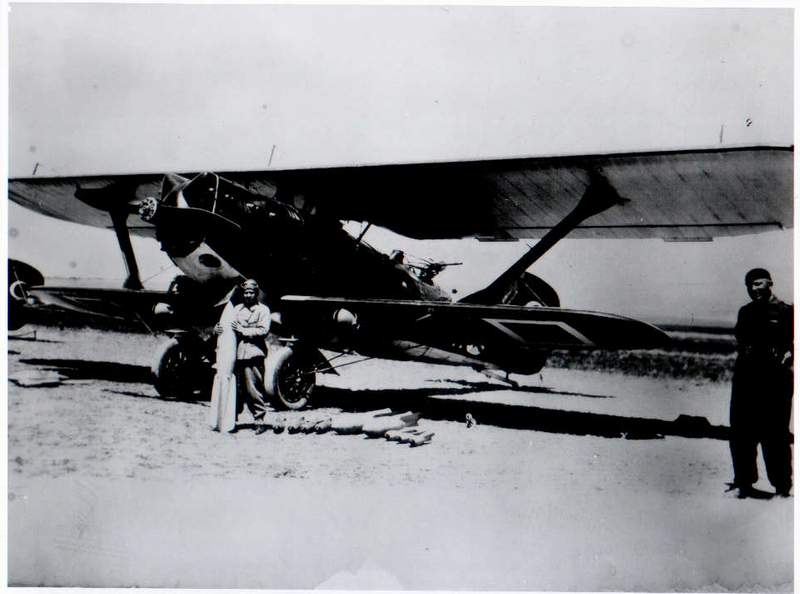
Sabiha Gökçen with her Breguet 19.

Turkish women have voluntarily taken tasks in the defence of their country. Nene Hatun, whose monument has been erected in Erzurum, fought during the Ottoman-Russian War. Turkish women also took main roles in combat in WWI and the Independence War. Sabiha Gökçen was the first Turkish female combat pilot, having flown 22 different types of aircraft for more than 8,000 hours, 32 hours of which were active combat and bombardment missions.

Women personnel are being employed as officers in the Turkish Armed Forces today. As of 2005, there are 1245 female officers and NCOs in the Turkish Armed Forces. Women officers serve in all branches except armor, infantry, and submarines. Assignments, promotions and training are considered on an equal basis with no gender bias.

=== United Kingdom ===
In July 2016 all exclusions on women serving in Ground Close Combat (GCC) roles were lifted.

All roles in the King's Royal Hussars, the Royal Tank Regiment, and all Army Reserve Royal Armoured Corps units have been opened to women, and women were permitted to join the rest of the previously closed GCC roles in the Royal Armoured Corps, British Army Infantry, Royal Marines and the RAF Regiment by the end of 2018.

It's important to note, however, that even though GCC roles were closed to women until 2016, women have been previously on the "front line" and exposed to combat in the wars in Iraq and Afghanistan through other roles, such as all roles in the Royal Artillery, which despite being one of the combat arms is not classed as a GCC role. Women were permitted to serve in Fire Support Teams and on 105mm L118 Light Gun crews. Women were also permitted to apply to join the Special Reconnaissance Regiment, which is one of the major components of the UK Special Forces alongside the Special Air Service, Special Boat Service and Special Forces Support Group. Women also served as combat medics attached to Army Infantry, Royal Marines and other GCC units. Some were awarded the prestigious Military Cross for bravery under fire.

Six British women in the Iraq War, and three in the Afghanistan War were killed in action.

=== United States ===
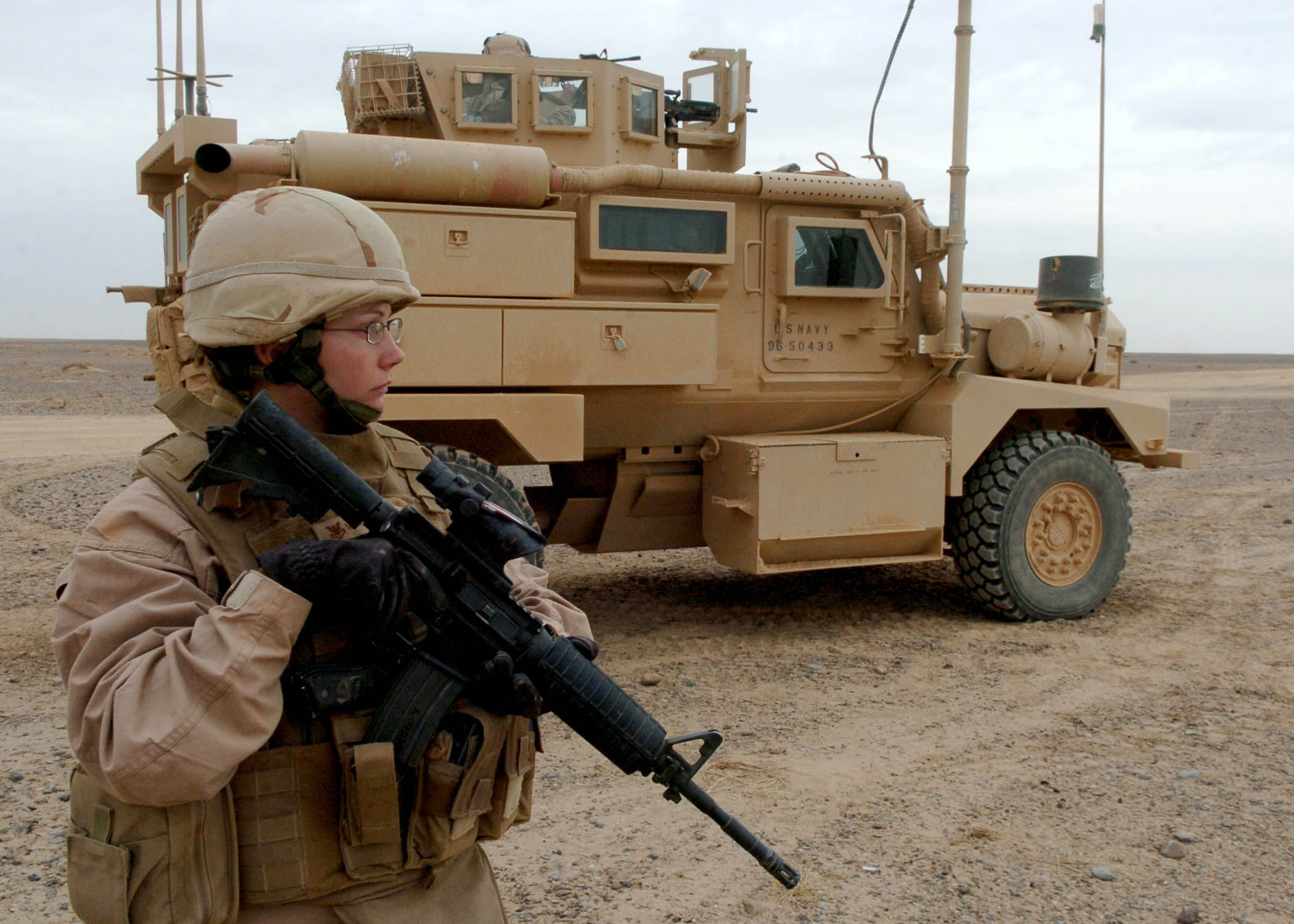
A female US Navy engineer on guard duty during a deployment to Afghanistan in 2009

As far back as the Revolutionary War, when Molly Pitcher took over a cannon after her husband fell in the field where she was delivering water, have at times been forced into combat, though until recently they have been formally banned from choosing to do so intentionally.

In WWI and WWII women served in numerous roles such as the Army Nurse Corps, and the Women's Army Corps (WAC). They carried out various roles such as clerical work, mechanical work, photo analysis, and sheet metal working; in some cases they were utilized as test pilots for fighter planes as WASPS. In 1979, enlistment qualifications became the same for men and women. While women were able to enlist, they were prohibited from direct combat roles or assignments. In 1991, the United States Congress removed the longtime ban on women from serving in warplane cockpits, though this new law would not be enforced by the U.S. Department of Defense until April 28, 1993. In 1994, the Department of Defense prohibited women from being assigned to a direct ground combat unit below the brigade level, while also allowing women to serve in certain positions by exception. The United States has more women in its military than any other nation.

The terrorist attacks of September 11, 2001 was a pivotal point for women in the Military. As the Army's mission changed in Iraq and Afghanistan, the roles of women also changed in the ranks. In 2016, women had the equal right to choose any military occupational specialty such as ground units that were not authorized before.

One significant female contribution was recognized on June 16, 2005, when Sgt. Ann Hester was awarded the Silver Star for her actions during a firefight that took place outside Baghdad. This was the first Silver Star in U.S. military history awarded to a woman soldier, not tied to Army medicine.

On January 24, 2013, Secretary of Defense Leon Panetta removed the military's ban on women serving in combat. Implementation of these rules is ongoing. There is some speculation that this could lead to women having to register with the Selective Service System.

On November 21, 2013, the first three women to ever complete the United States Marine Corps' Infantry Training Battalion course graduated from the United States Marine Corps School of Infantry in Camp Geiger, North Carolina. However, these three female graduates will still not be allowed to serve in infantry units until further studies can demonstrate they are physically capable of doing so. However it was later reported on January 3, 2017 that three women who graduated became the first join a Marine combat battalion that would serve as a rifleman, machine gunner and mortar Marine in the 1st Battalion, 8th Marines.

In April 2015, a 2 1/2-year period in which the tough Marine Corps' Infantry Officer Course became gender-integrated for research ended without a single female graduate. The final two participants in the Marines' experiment with training women for ground combat started and failed the IOC on April 2. Both were dropped that same day during the grueling initial Combat Endurance Test.

Army Ranger Battalions and Navy SEAL units planned to open positions to women by 2015 and 2016, respectively. In August 2015, Capt. Kristen Griest and 1st Lt. Shaye Haver became the first two women to graduate from the U.S. Army Ranger School, though at the time, women were not eligible to enlist in the 75th Ranger Regiment. In September 2015, Ranger School would permanently open to women. In 2016, Griest became the first female infantry officer in the US Army when the Army approved her request to transfer there from a military police unit. By August 2019, 30 women earned their U.S. Army Ranger tab

In December 2015, Defense Secretary Ash Carter stated that starting in 2016 all combat jobs would open to women. The decision was not supported by Chairman of the Joint Chiefs of Staff General Joseph Dunford of the Marine Corps, who wanted to keep certain direct combat positions such as infantry and machine gunner closed to women.

In March 2016, Ash Carter approved final plans from military service branches and the U.S. Special Operations Command to open all combat jobs to women and authorized the military to begin integrating female combat soldiers "right away." For the first time in United States military history women faced no obstacle to contribute to the Department of Defense mission as long as they qualified with the standards allocated. On October 26, 2016, ten women became the first female graduates from the United States Army's Infantry Basic Officer Leader's Course at Fort Benning, Georgia.

In December 2016, an anonymous woman passed the RASP II selection course for the 75th Ranger Regiment. She was the first woman to graduate from a special operations unit selection course.

On September 25, 2017, an anonymous woman, later revealed to be 1st Lt. Marina Hierl, became the first to complete the United States Marine Corps' Infantry Officer Course at Marine Corps Base Quantico in Quantico, Virginia and become the first female Marine infantry officer. The U.S. Marine Corps Depot in Parris Island, South Carolina has trained female U.S. marine recruits in female Marine units since 1949. On December 14, 2020, it was revealed that the previously all-male Marine Corps Recruit Depot San Diego agreed to join the Marine Corps Recruit Depot Parris Island in accepting female recruits, with 60 female recruits beginning their training in February 2021. Three women had previously managed to successfully complete training at the depot in December 2020 to become drill instructors. By February 2021, female drill instructors were actively training female recruits at the San Diego depot as well. On April 22, 2021, 53 of these recruits became Marines after successfully completing boot camp training.

== Debates ==
There exists debate over the effects of integration of women into combat roles and units. A 2017 study from Whittier College described the debate as:

"Those against ground combat roles for women contend that women are physically weaker, that integration will harm unit cohesion, and that leaders will lower standards to be "politically correct," all of which endangers individual soldiers and damages military effectiveness. Categorical stereotypes, where women are inherently different and inferior to men, underlie these views, which are supported by an essentialist ideology and a logic of averages. In contrast, those in support of women in combat argue that women are already exposed to the violence of war and that military jobs should be determined based on meeting objective standards that are necessary for job success not ascribed status. These supporters have a diversity ideology and use a logic of distribution. They argue that integration improves military effectiveness, because it expands the pool of talented people that can make valuable contributions on the battlefield. They also believe that ground combat exclusion has prevented women from serving their country and being rewarded for it, thus the new policy change expands citizenship rights for women."

A 2013 study done by Global Policy on the ongoing debate, which categorizes the debate into four areas of concern: physical, social, tactical, and combat support.

=== Physical concerns ===
There is an ongoing debate over the potentially lower combat capability of female units. Studies and tests of the combat performance of female and male units conducted in Norway, Germany and 8 other EU countries, during the period of 2011 to 2015, show that female units performance is almost equal to that of men, as all-female and mixed (female and male) units showed almost the same results as all-male units, without any significant differences between the sexes. Such research has suggested there are no differences between males and females in performance of basic combat tasks such as shooting accurately.

A study within the British Army found that women performed comparatively worse when it came to physically demanding tasks, such as carrying heavy equipment for extensive periods, and that mixed combat units have lower levels of cohesion when there are more women present. Other studies in European countries have contradicted these results, showing that many female soldiers performed better than men on physical tests. It is possible that there are gaps in the training of some female combat units due to sexist prejudices and differences in expectations towards both sexes. However, there have been contradicting results around unit cohesion from various studies in other countries, including in a year-long study in the United States Marine Corps, which also found that all-male combat groups perform better than mixed groups, being "more accurate hitting targets, faster at climbing over obstacles, [and] better at avoiding injuries". This study found that women were twice as likely to suffer injuries significant enough to remove them from duty, and that women's shooting accuracy was much less than that of men in simulated combat situations. It also found that female soldiers had lower performance in basic combat tasks like negotiating obstacles and removing wounded troops from the battlefield. The US data was questioned because it contrasted with data from other countries.

Some experts believe as the female skeletal system is less dense it is more prone to breakages. Furthermore, health issues regarding women are argued as the reason that some submarine services avoid accepting women, although mixed-gender accommodations in a small space is also an issue, as is explained in more depth below. While on average, women display poorer physical capability than men, there are many individuals capable of performing equally or even outperforming their average male counterparts.

In the Austrian Armed Forces and almost all NATO countries, significantly lower physical performance requirements for entrance and subsequent tests apply to female soldiers in determining fitness for service. The Swiss Armed Forces abolished this advantage for female soldiers in 2007.

A 2015 study in the Journal of Strength and Conditioning Research found that "women experience substantial gains in aerobic power and strength with appropriate and targeted training, narrowing the gap in physical performance between the sexes". A 2014 study in BioMed Research International of a mixed-gender Israeli brigade found that "attrition rates because of medical reasons were the same" between men and women. However, the fact still remains that although reported rates of injury are comparable between the two sexes, "women, on average, have lower aerobic and muscular performance than men", mostly due to men generally having greater muscle mass concentration, especially in the upper body.

=== Social concerns ===
The purported disruption of a combat unit's morale is cited as another reason for women to be banned from front-line combat situations. A 2021 Norwegian study, however, found that "contrary to the predictions of many policy makers, we do not find that integrating women into squads hurt male recruits' performance or satisfaction with service."

There is a secondary concern that romantic relationships between men and women on the front lines could disrupt a unit's fighting capability and a fear that a high number of women would deliberately become pregnant in order to escape combat duties. To compare, the U.S. military is substantially staffed by young women. The volunteer military has turned out to be "family friendly". Marriage is frequent and fertility levels are increasing to this day in the military.

Not only do women run the risk of being harassed or assaulted by their coworkers, but they also have to be vigilant about the enemy assaulting or harassing them in a combat zone.

A third argument against the inclusion of women in combat units is that women should not be placed in combat situations where they are at risk of being captured, tortured and possibly sexually assaulted. Rhonda Cornum, then a Major and flight surgeon, and now a Brigadier General and Command Surgeon for United States Army Forces Command, was an Iraqi prisoner of war in 1991. At the time, she was asked not to mention that she had been molested while in captivity.

A 2019 study in Occupational Medicine among British military women found that "PTSD symptoms were similar by gender." A 2021 study in the Journal of Psychiatric Research found that "incidence and prevalence of PTSD diagnosis were higher among women, but persistence of PTSD diagnosis was higher in men" and that "higher rates of new PTSD diagnosis among women were not dependent on combat exposure, suggesting that other types of trauma may be responsible for increased rates among women."

A 2026 study of women's integration into U.S. military combat units found that it "does not negatively affect men’s performance or behavioral outcomes, including retention, promotions, demotions, separations for misconduct, criminal investigations, and medical conditions... However, there is a wedge between men’s perceptions and performance. The integration of women causes a negative shift in male soldiers’ perceptions of workplace quality. The decline is driven by units integrated with female officers, likely arising from female officers increasing men’s awareness of workplace problems or from men’s dissatisfaction from working with women in positions of authority—even though men in such units show some performance gains."

=== Tactical concerns ===
One study from Harvard Business School and MIT has claimed that group intelligence of an organization rises when women are on teams. A 2009 review for the British Ministry of Defence found that "cohesion in mixed gender teams during ground close combat incidents was consistently reported to be high." A 2019 study in Military Medicine found that "instructor ratings of recruit performance, including their teamwork, were similar for males and females regardless of the gender composition of platoons." A 2018 Australian study found "nearly complete overlap in the performance of female versus male recruits. The detected gender-related differences were negligible to small in size."

Lieutenant colonel Dave Grossman's book On Killing briefly mentions that female soldiers in the Israel Defense Forces (IDF) have been officially prohibited from serving in close combat military operations since 1948. The reason for removing female soldiers from the front lines was due less to the performance of female soldiers, and more due to the behavior of the male infantrymen after witnessing a woman wounded. The IDF saw a complete loss of control over soldiers who apparently experienced an instinctual protective aggression that was uncontrollable, severely degrading the unit's combat effectiveness. However, in 2001, subsequent to the publication of Grossman's book, women did begin serving in IDF combat units on an experimental basis. There is now a male-female infantry battalion, the Caracal Battalion.

In a similar vein, Melody Kemp mentions that the Australian military has also voiced similar concerns saying their soldiers "are reluctant to take women on reconnaissance or special operations, as they fear that in the case of combat or discovery, their priority will be to save the women and not to complete the mission. Thus while men might be able to be programmed to kill, it is not as easy to program men to neglect women."

=== Combat support ===
In modern warfare, however, where "winning minds" and gaining intelligence can prove more important at times than enemy casualties, having female soldiers serving alongside a combat unit may have some advantages. For example, the use of female US military personnel attached to combat units specifically for the purpose of performing culturally sensitive searches such as in the USMC Lioness program which used female Marines to search females at checkpoints both on the Iraq-Syrian border and inside urban areas. Another example is the US Army Cultural Support Teams (CSTs) that accompany special operations teams and work alongside them providing access to the needs of and information and from local community women in communities where contact between male soldiers and civilian women is culturally fraught.

Women made a huge impact in 2010 when the United States Army began utilizing Female Engagement Teams in Afghanistan. The main purpose for these teams was to engage more female populations where such combat was not possible by male service members. These teams perform a number of duties, including intelligence gathering, relationship building, and humanitarian efforts.

There is evidence showing women in both Iraq and Afghanistan have had considerable success in acquiring intelligence from children and women. In these cases, the US military adheres to local customs for the purposes of counterinsurgency, whereby males are not permitted to talk to women who are not in their family or are not married to them.

== In popular culture ==
- The 1988-91 American war drama television series China Beach looks at the Vietnam War from the perspectives of the women, military personnel and civilians who were present during the conflict. It was partially inspired by the book Home Before Morning (1983) written by former U.S. Army Nurse Lynda Van Devanter and the show's character Nurse Colleen McMurphy roughly follows her experiences as a nurse in Vietnam.
- The 1996 war film Courage Under Fire explores a fictional story of a female helicopter pilot's nomination for the Medal of Honor. In actuality, Mary Edwards Walker, a physician during the American Civil War, stands as the sole woman to have received the Medal of Honor.
- The 1997 movie G.I. Jane explores the topic of women in combat, telling the fictional story of the first woman to undergo special operations training.
- The 2017 film, Megan Leavey, depicts a true story of a female Marine K9 Handler and her K9 Rex, facing combat in Fallujah, Iraq.

== See also ==
- Combat Exclusion Policy
- Presidential Commission on the Assignment of Women in the Armed Forces
- Women in the military in the Americas
- Women in the military in Europe
- Women in the military by country
- Women in the Philippine military
- Wartime sexual violence
