= Lisa Jaster =

United States Army Reserve Colonel

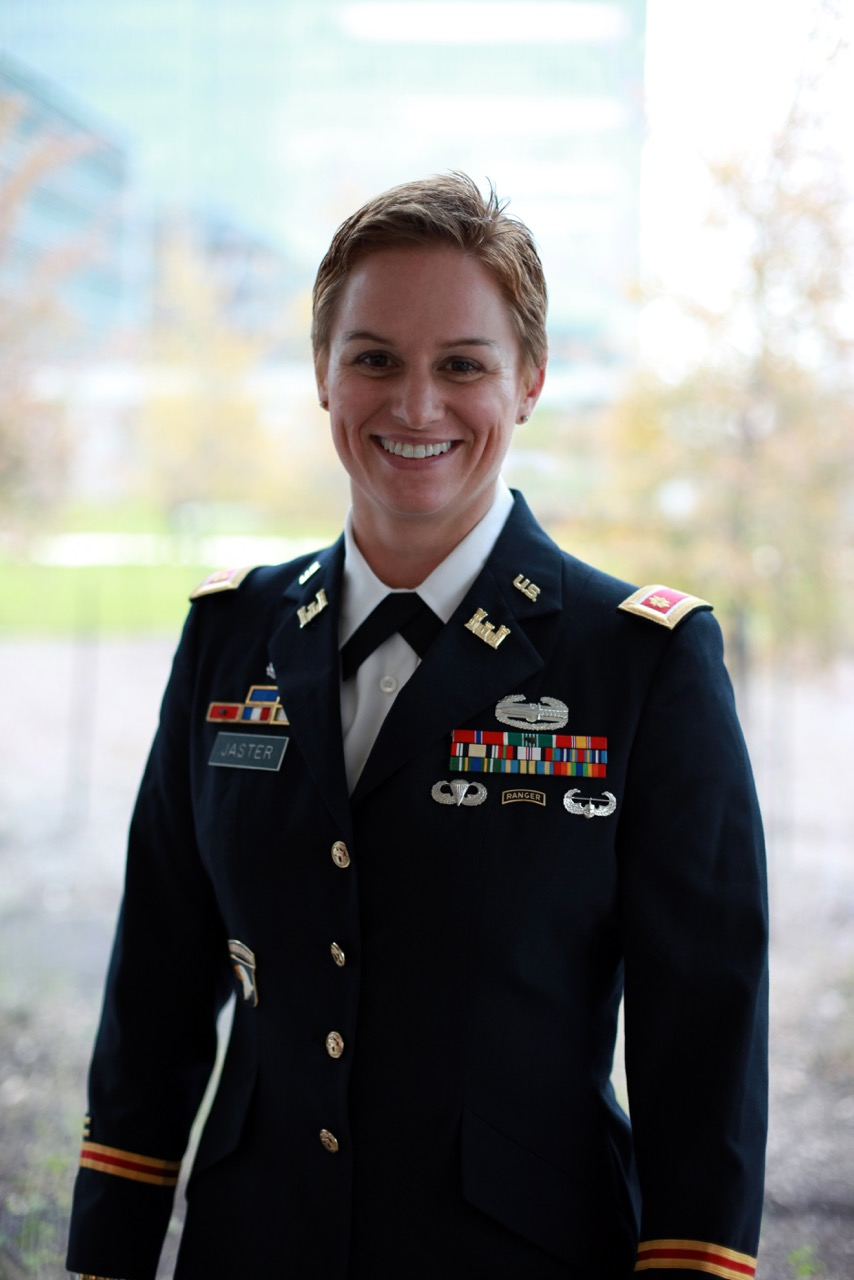
- Born: 1978 (age 47–48)
- Education: US Military Academy (B.S.); U. of Missouri-Rolla (M.S.)
- Spouse: Allan Jaster
- Children: Zachary and Victoria
- Military career
- Allegiance: United States of America
- Branch: United States Army; Engineer
- Service years: 2000 to present
- Rank: Colonel
- Conflicts: Iraq War; War in Afghanistan
- Awards: Ranger Tab; Bronze Star Medal; Meritorious Svc Med

Lisa Jaster is a United States Army Reserve Colonel and engineer officer who was the first female reserve soldier to graduate from the Army's Ranger School. She completed the training, which as many as 60 percent of students fail within the first four days, after "recycling" through, or retrying, several phases of the multi-locational course. Due to being recycled, she was at the school for six months; the school takes a minimum of 61 days and includes up to 20 hours of training per day alongside a strict diet. She graduated at age 37, while the average trainee age is 23.

Jaster, a marathoner and CrossFit fanatic, served seven years on active duty (including tours in Iraq and Afghanistan). She faced difficult moments throughout her Ranger training, and cites the day two other women in the program advanced ahead of her to become the first and second female Rangers as especially trying. Throughout her training, she says she drew strength from her family, keeping pictures of her two young children with husband U.S. Marine Lt. Col. Allan Jaster in her pocket and stealing glances between training assignments.

Prior to receiving her Ranger tab, Jaster worked as an engineer with Shell Oil in Houston and an Army Reserve individual mobilization augmentee with the U.S. Army Corps of Engineers. She initially was commissioned in the Army in 2000 after graduating from the United States Military Academy at West Point, and returned to the reserves in 2012 after a 5-year hiatus from serving. She volunteered for combat training when she discovered the Army Ranger course was being opened to women for the first time in 60 years as a U.S. government experiment to gauge how women would fare in the course

Jaster's military awards include the Bronze Star Medal. and the Meritorious Service Medal.

== Early career ==
Jaster was commissioned as a U.S. Army Engineer Officer in 2000 upon graduation from the United States Military Academy in West Point, New York. She was initially assigned to Fort Stewart in eastern Georgia with the 92nd Engineer Battalion, and deployed in support of the wars in Iraq and Afghanistan in her first four years (Operation Enduring Freedom I and Operation Iraqi Freedom I). Jaster was then reassigned to Fort Leonard Wood, Missouri, for school, where she met her husband, Marine Lt. Col. Allan Jaster. She left active-duty in 2007 and started a family and civilian career with Shell, but returned to the Army as a reservist in 2014. Jaster holds a BS and MS in Civil Engineering.

== Ranger school ==
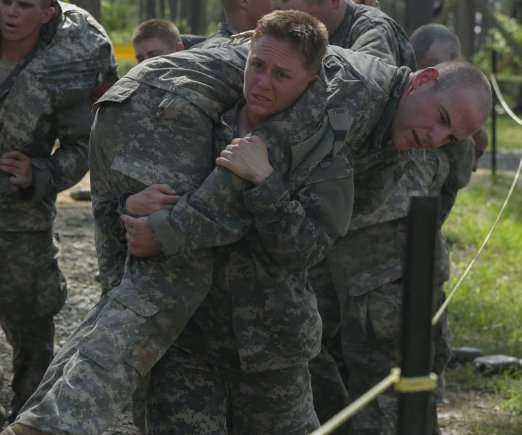
Maj. Lisa Jaster, an Army Reserve soldier, performs a fireman's carry on a simulated casualty during the Ranger Course at Ft. Benning, GA. The 37-year-old engineer and mother of two children, aged 7 and 3, is the first female Army Reserve officer to graduate Ranger School.

One of the first three women to graduate the United States Army Ranger School, Jaster was the first female United States Army Reserve officer to earn the Ranger Tab. She completed the training, which as many as 60 percent of students fail within the first four days, after repeatedly "recycling" through, or retrying, several phases of the multi-locational course. There were 400 participants, 19 of whom were women, who initially began the training. Jaster endured the training, which takes a minimum of 61 days and includes up to 20 hours of training per day alongside a strict diet, for a grueling six months. She graduated at age 37, while the average trainee age is 23. Major Kristen Griest and Major Shaye Lynne Haver are the two other women aside from Jaster who have earned the Ranger tab. They recycled together for the first round, but went on while she had to recycle for the second round. Jaster joined 87 other students in receiving the tab in a ceremony at Fort Benning.

== Honors ==
In 2018, Jaster, along with Kristen Griest and Shaye Haver were inducted into the US Army Women's Foundation Hall of Fame.

== Awards and decorations ==
Personal decorations
	Bronze Star Medal with one Oak Leaf Cluster
	Meritorious Service Medal
Width-44 myrtle green ribbon with width-3 white stripes at the edges and five width-1 stripes down the center; the central white stripes are width-2 apart	Army Commendation Medal with two Oak Leaf Clusters
	Army Achievement Medal
	Army Reserve Component Achievement Medal
	National Defense Service Medal
	Afghanistan Campaign Medal
	Iraq Campaign Medal with one Oak Leaf Cluster
	Global War on Terrorism Expeditionary Medal
	Korea Defense Service Medal
	Military Outstanding Volunteer Service Medal
	Army Service Ribbon

Other accoutrements
Combat Action Badge
Parachutist Badge
Air Assault Badge
Ranger Tab
101st Airborne Division Combat Service Identification Badge
92nd Engineer Battalion Distinctive unit insignia
2 Overseas Service Bars
Steel De Fleury Medal

== Personal life ==
After moving from Fort Stewart to Fort Leonard Wood, Jaster met her husband, Marine Lt. Col. Allan Jaster, veteran of both Iraq and Afghanistan, and officer in the Marine Corps Reserve. They have two children together, Zachary and Victoria, and live in Texas. Jaster credits the support of her family as being the reason why she was able to complete her training at Ranger School.

In her spare time, Jaster primarily reads, works out, spends time with the family, and trains in Brazilian jiu-jitsu.
