= Hypersthenuria =

Urinary condition

Hypersthenuria is a condition where the osmolality of the urine is increased. Types include:

Hyposthenuria, where sg is lower than 1.007

Isosthenuria, where sg is 1.010

Hypersthenuria, where sg is greater than 1.025

== See also ==
- Hyposthenuria
- Isosthenuria
