= Renal medullary carcinoma =

Cancer affecting the kidneys

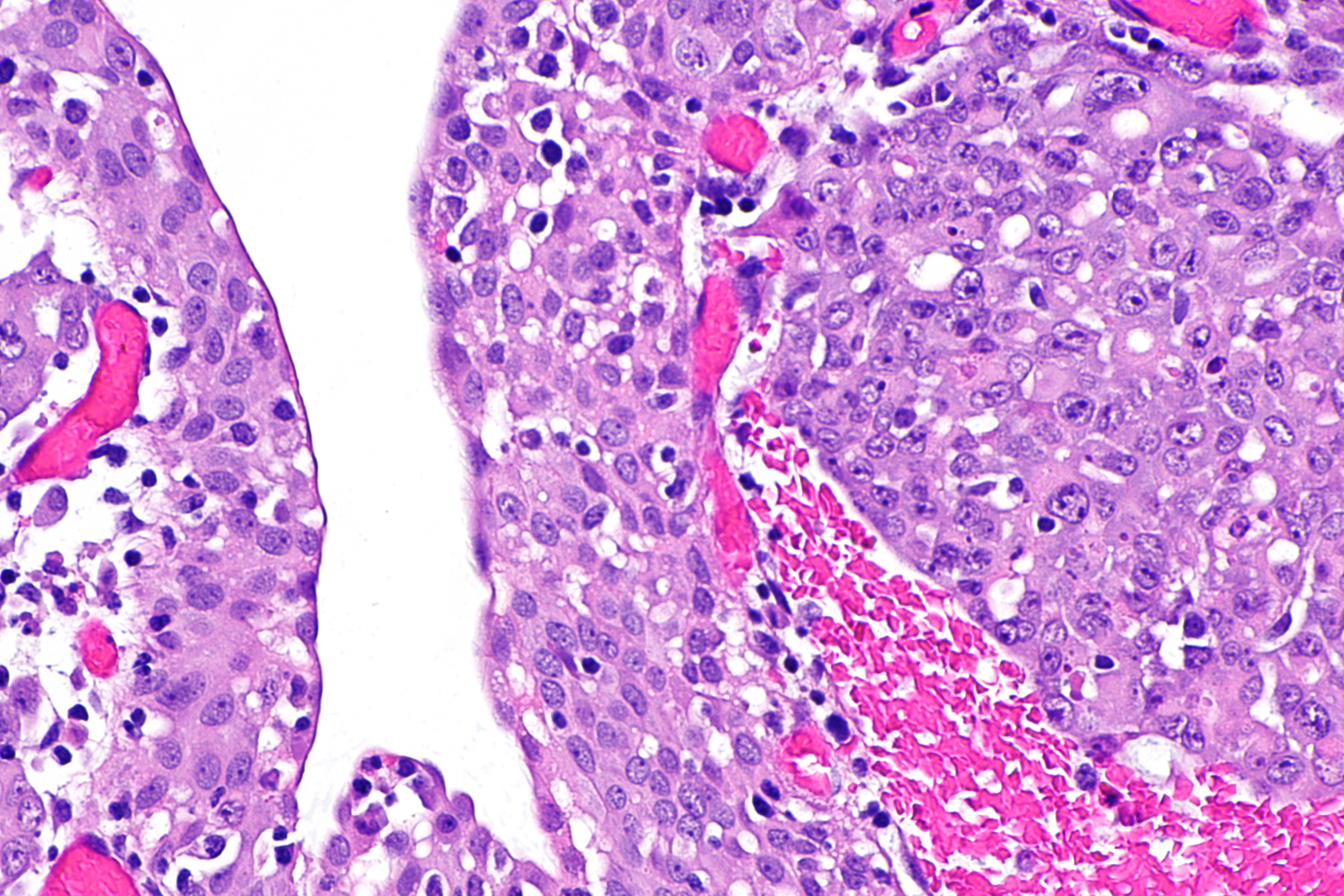
- Renal medullary carcinoma (right of image), reactive urothelium and sickled red blood cells. H&E stain.
- Specialty: Oncology / urology
- Symptoms: hematuria, abdominal mass, abdominal pain, weight loss
- Usual onset: young adults typically
- Risk factors: sickle cell trait, sickle cell disease
- Diagnostic method: histology and immunohistochemistry (SMARCB1 loss)
- Differential diagnosis: other forms of kidney cancer
- Prognosis: poor
- Frequency: rare

Renal medullary carcinoma is a rare type of cancer that affects the kidney. It tends to be aggressive, difficult to treat, and is often metastatic at the time of diagnosis. Most individuals with this type of cancer have sickle cell trait or rarely sickle cell disease, suggesting that the sickle cell trait may be a risk factor for this type of cancer.

== Signs and symptoms ==
In a case series of 34 patients, Davis and colleagues reported the following signs and symptoms:

- macroscopically visible (gross) hematuria (60%)
- abdominal or back/flank pain (50%)
- significant weight loss (25%)

Other researchers have reported a palpable renal mass or enlarged lymph nodes.

== Causes ==
The etiology of renal medullary carcinoma is still not completely understood. However, the majority of individuals diagnosed with this type of cancer have had sickle cell trait, in which the person carries one normal copy of the hemoglobin A gene (HbA) and one copy of the hemoglobin A gene harboring the genetic mutation found in sickle cell disease (HbS). These individuals do not have sickle cell disease but can manifest symptoms such as kidney damage over the course of their lives.

== Mechanism ==
The finding that virtually all people affected by renal medullary carcinoma carry at least one copy of the HbS mutation suggests that sickle cell trait somehow predisposes to this type of cancer. The precise mechanism is unknown, but red blood cells with a sickle cell configuration have been identified in pathology specimens.

== Diagnosis ==
The diagnosis of renal medullary carcinoma is typically made after individuals with sickle cell trait present with the typical signs and symptoms outlined above, in combination with radiographic imaging (usually abdominal/pelvic CT scan) studies and ultimately surgical biopsy and pathological examination of the tumor. Findings on radiographic examination are non-specific and can reveal a mass deep within the kidney. Histopathology studies show a distinctive pattern that can be distinguished from other renal tumors.

=== Classification ===
Renal medullary carcinoma has been termed "the seventh sickle cell nephropathy" because it is found almost exclusively in individuals with sickle cell trait or occasionally in those with sickle cell disease.

== Prevention ==
Renal medullary carcinoma is extremely rare and it is not currently possible to predict those individuals with sickle cell trait who will eventually develop this cancer. It is hoped that early detection could result in better outcomes but screening is not currently feasible. With genomics and science advancing, we can possibly find these mutated genes with proactive genetic screening so that future generations don’t differ but science can interfere with its natural course to a more directed course, avoiding such mutations from manifesting and cause death in later generations.

== Management ==
This cancer is typically aggressive, presents at an advanced stage when the cancer has already metastasized, and is resistant to chemotherapy. It therefore poses a significant management challenge. Current treatment options include surgical resection and chemotherapy with a variety of agents, including (but not limited to) ifosfamide, etoposide, carboplatin, and topotecan. A recent study looked at the use of methotrexate, vinblastine, doxorubicin, and cisplatin in 3 patients and saw a partial response and longer survival than historical reports. Carboplatin, gemcitibine, and paclitaxel provided a complete response in a patient with advanced disease. The role of radiation is unclear; some tumors have shown a response to radiation. Due to the apparent propensity for the tumor to spread to the central nervous system, it has been suggested that prophylactic craniospinal irradiation should be considered.

== Prognosis ==
Since the cancer most often presents at an advanced stage, prognosis is generally very poor, with median survival times of 3 months (range 1–7 months). Longer survival of beyond one year was reported in one patient and of up to eight years in one individual whose tumor was well circumscribed and non-metastatic at the time of diagnosis, suggesting that early detection could dramatically improve survival.

== Epidemiology ==
As of 2009, there have been approximately 120 reported cases of renal medullary carcinoma. In every instance except for one, the patients were positive for cell sickling. Wilms' tumor, the most common renal tumor of childhood, is responsible for 6-7% of childhood cancer whereas all remaining primary renal tumors (among which is included renal medullary carcinoma) collectively account for less than 1% of all childhood cancer and less than 10% of primary kidney tumors in childhood.

== History ==
Renal medullary carcinoma was first described as a clinicopathologic entity in 1995.
