= Isosthenuria =

Excretion of urine reflecting kidney damage

Isosthenuria refers to the excretion of urine whose specific gravity (concentration) is neither greater (more concentrated) nor less (more diluted) than that of protein-free plasma, typically 1.008-1.012. Isosthenuria reflects damage to the kidney's tubules or the renal medulla.

A closely related term is hyposthenuria, where the urine has a relatively low specific gravity "due to inability of the kidney to concentrate the urine normally". This specific gravity is not necessarily equal to that of plasma. Therefore, unlike isosthenuria, this condition is not associated with kidney failure as the kidney tubules have altered the glomerular filtrate.

== Clinical significance ==
Isosthenuria may be seen in disease states as chronic kidney disease and acute kidney injury in which the kidneys lack the ability to concentrate or dilute the urine and so the initial filtrate of the blood remains unchanged despite the need to conserve or excrete water based on the body's hydration status.

Sickle-cell trait, the heterozygous form of sickle-cell disease, presents with a normal hematological picture but is associated with hyposthenuria.

== See also ==
- Hypersthenuria
