= Sickle cell trait =

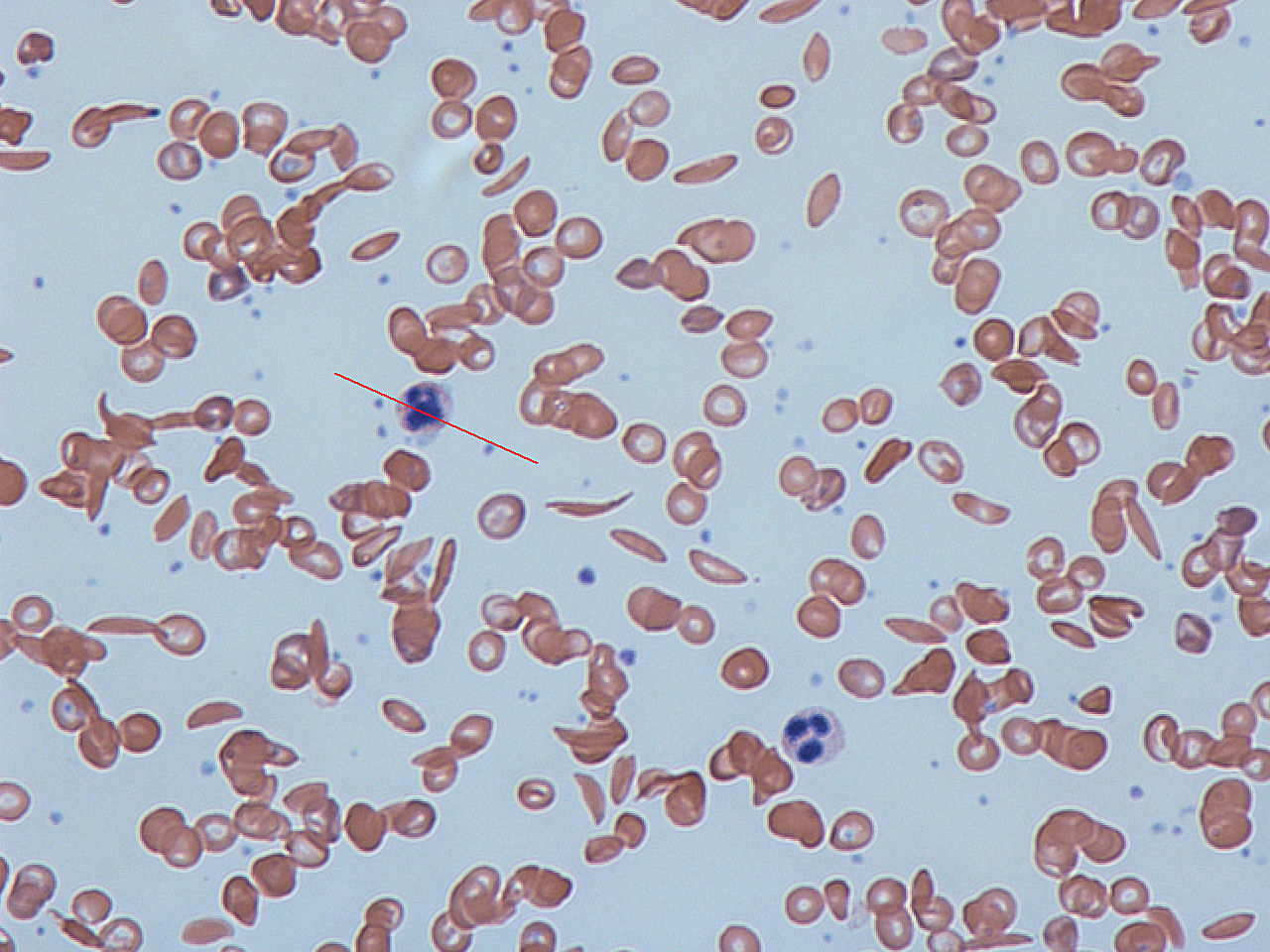
- Sickle cells in human blood: both normal red blood cells and sickle-shaped cells are present
- Specialty: Hematology

Sickle cell trait describes a condition in which a person has one abnormal allele of the hemoglobin beta gene (is heterozygous), but does not display the severe symptoms of sickle cell disease that occur in a person who has two copies of that allele (is homozygous). Those who are heterozygous for the sickle cell allele produce both normal and abnormal hemoglobin (the two alleles are codominant with respect to the actual concentration of hemoglobin in the circulating).

Sickle cell disease is a blood disorder in which a single amino acid substitution in hemoglobin can cause red blood cells to become sickle-shaped, especially under low-oxygen conditions. Sickling confers some resistance to malaria parasitization of red blood cells, so that individuals with sickle-cell trait (heterozygotes) have a selective advantage in environments where malaria is present.

== Symptoms and signs ==
Sickle cell trait is a hemoglobin genotype AS and is generally regarded as a benign condition. However, individuals with sickle cell trait may have rare complications. For example, in November 2010, Dr. Jeffery K. Taubenberger of the National Institutes of Health discovered the earliest proof of sickle-cell disease while looking for the virus of the 1918 flu during the autopsy of an African-American soldier. Taubenberger's autopsy results showed that the soldier had had a sickle-cell crisis that contributed to his death even though he had only one copy of the gene. There have been calls to reclassify sickle cell trait as a disease state, based on its malignant clinical presentations. Significance may be greater during exercise.

=== Association with other medical conditions ===
==== Malaria ====
The sickle cell trait provides a survival advantage against malaria fatality over people with normal hemoglobin in regions where malaria is endemic. The trait is known to cause significantly fewer deaths due to malaria, especially when Plasmodium falciparum is the causative organism. This is a prime example of natural selection, evidenced by the fact that the geographical distribution of the gene for hemoglobin S and the distribution of malaria in Africa virtually overlap. Because of the unique survival advantage, people with the trait become increasingly numerous as the number of malaria-infected people increases. Conversely, people who have normal hemoglobin are more likely to succumb to the complications of malaria.

The way in which sickle cell protects against malaria is attributed to several different things. One of the more common explanations is that the sickle hemoglobin inhibits the plasmodium parasite from infecting the red blood cells which reduces the number of malaria parasites to infect the host. Another factor is the production of heme oxygenase-1 (HO-1) enzyme, which is highly present in the sickle hemoglobin. This enzyme produces carbon monoxide which has been proven to protect against cerebral malaria.

==== Established associations ====
- Hematuria
- Hyposthenuria
- Renal medullary carcinoma, a cancer affecting the kidney, is a very rare complication seen in patients with sickle cell trait.
- Renal papillary necrosis (only considered "possible" by some sources)
- Splenic infarcts at high altitude. Surgery may not always be necessary.
- Sudden deaths during physical exertion in African-American military recruits and athletes
- Urinary tract infection

==== Suggested ====
- Probable: complicated hyphema, venous thromboembolic events, fetal loss, neonatal deaths, and preeclampsia
- Possible: acute chest syndrome, asymptomatic bacteriuria, and anemia in pregnancy
- Insufficient evidence: retinopathy, cholelithiasis, priapism, leg ulcers, liver necrosis, avascular necrosis of the femoral head, and stroke. An association with complicated migraines has been suggested.

There have been reports of pulmonary venous thromboembolism in pregnant women with sickle cell trait, or men during prolonged airflight, and mild strokes and abnormalities on PET scans in children with the trait.

Sickle cell trait appears to worsen the complications seen in diabetes mellitus type 2 (retinopathy, nephropathy and proteinuria) and provoke hyperosmolar diabetic coma nephropathy, especially in male patients.

== Genetics ==
Normally, a person inherits two copies of the gene that produces beta-globin, a protein needed to produce normal hemoglobin (hemoglobin A, genotype AA). A person with sickle cell trait inherits one normal allele and one abnormal allele encoding hemoglobin S (hemoglobin genotype AS).

The sickle cell trait can be used to demonstrate the concepts of co-dominance and incomplete dominance. An individual with the sickle cell trait shows incomplete dominance when the shape of the red blood cell is considered. This is because the sickling happens only at low oxygen concentrations. With regards to the actual concentration of hemoglobin in the circulating cells, the alleles demonstrate co-dominance as both 'normal' and mutant forms co-exist in the bloodstream. Thus it is an ambiguous condition showing both incomplete dominance and co-dominance.

Unlike the sickle-cell trait, sickle-cell disease is passed on in a recessive manner. Sickle cell anemia affects about 72,000 people in the United States. Most Americans who have sickle cell anemia are of African descent. The disease also affects Americans from the Caribbean, Central America, and parts of South America, Turkey, Greece, Italy, the Middle East and East India.

Sickle-cell disease and the associated trait are most prevalent in Africa and Central America, which is attributed to natural selection: the sickle-cell trait confers a survival advantage in areas with a high occurrence of malaria, which has a high death rate among individuals without the trait.

There also have been studies that show changes in the globin genes. There have been noted changes in the beta-globin sequence, to what is known as the sickle hemoglobin.

The significance of the sickle-cell trait is that it does not show any symptoms, nor does it cause any major difference in blood cell count. There are about 30% of people who carry the sickle cell trait that are naturally protected against malaria. With malaria and sickle cell trait occurrences appearing to have risen in Africa, India and the Middle East. Some findings also show the reduction of the sickle-cell trait in those who retain much more fetal hemoglobin than usual in adulthood. Fetal hemoglobin likely plays a role in the prevention of sickling. Elevated fetal hemoglobin levels have been observed in populations where sickle-cell disease is prevalent.

Whole genome sequence analysis has identified a single origin of the sickle trait, with one haplotype ancestral to all sickle-cell variants. This haplotype is thought to have originated in the Sahara during the Holocene Wet Phase around 7,300 years ago. Sickle cell variants descended from this ancestral haplotype comprise five haplotypes named after toponyms or ethnolinguistic groups (the Arabian/Indian, Benin, Cameroon, Central African Republic/Bantu, and Senegal variants), and another designation earmarked for atypical sickle-cell haplotypes. Their clinical importance is because some are associated with higher HbF levels (e.g., Senegal and Saudi-Asian variants tend to have milder disease).

== In athletes ==
In some cases, athletes with sickle cell trait do not achieve the same level of performance as elite athletes with normal hemoglobin (AA). Athletes with sickle cell trait and their instructors must be aware of the dangers of the condition during anaerobic exertion especially in hot and dehydrated conditions. In rare cases, exercise-induced dehydration or exhaustion may cause healthy red blood cells to turn sickle-shaped, which can cause death during sporting activities.

While more research is necessary on the topic, the correlation found between individuals with sickle cell trait and an increased risk of sudden death appears to be related to microcirculatory disorders, during exercise. In recent years the NCAA has partnered with the ACSM and issued a joint statement, warning athletes about both the prevalence and the potential risk factors of sickle cell trait. The NCAA has also recently encouraged athletes to become aware of their sickle cell trait status, as the trait itself does not typically result in symptoms under normal conditions but can become dangerous during extreme physical activity similar to the daily training that athletes undergo. Also, a peer-reviewed study found increased risk of exertional death in NCAA athletes with sickle cell trait, particularly before the introduction of screening policies. Sickle cell trait is the cause of death in military training and sports around the world. The study found that a legislative waiver was enacted in 2010 for athletes to complete screening or sign waivers to decline them.

Normal hemoglobin (and hemoglobin S in the presence of oxygen) contains a deformability characteristic that allows erythrocytes to essentially squeeze their way into smaller vessels, including those involved in microcirculation to the capillaries within muscle tissue as well as blood supply embedded within organ tissues. When hemoglobin S is deprived of oxygen, it can polymerize, which is what is proposed to cause the "sickled" cells. The sickled erythrocytes present a decreased deformability when compared to normal erythrocytes, leading to distress in circulation into the smaller vessels involved in microcirculation, particularly, in this case, the capillaries embedded in muscle tissue.

The resulting microvasculatory distress in capillaries specific to muscle tissue can cause acute rhabdomyolysis and necrosis within the muscle cells. The inflammation and leakage of intracellular material resulting from muscle cell necrosis releases a particular protein, myoglobin, into the blood stream. While necessary in muscle tissue to bind iron and oxygen, myoglobin circulating through the bloodstream can break down into smaller compounds that damage kidney cells, leading to various complications, such as those seen in sickle cell trait athletes during high levels of physical exertion.

Because of the link between deformability and sickled cells, deformability can be used to evaluate the amount of sickled cells in the blood. Deformability of the erythrocytes that cause the microcirculatory distress can be demonstrated through various other hemorheological characteristics. In order to determine the deformability of erythrocytes multiple factors including blood and plasma viscosity and hematocrit (a calculation of the percent of red blood cells present in the blood) are measured.

=== Alpha-thalassemia ===
Alpha-thalassemia, like sickle cell trait, is typically inherited in areas with increased exposure to malaria. It manifests itself as a decreased expression of alpha-globin chains, causing an imbalance and excess of beta-globin chains, and can occasionally result in anemic symptoms. The abnormal hemoglobin can cause the body to destroy red blood cells, essentially causing anemia.

In endurance-trained individuals with sickle cell trait the presence of alpha-thalassemia has been shown to act protectively against microvasculatory distress before, during, and after exercise.

=== Signs, symptoms, and prevention ===
Because of the microcirculatory distress, a telltale sign or symptom of a potential sickling collapse is cramping. Specifically to sickle cell trait, cramping occurs in the lower extremities and back in athletes undergoing intense physical activity or exertion. In comparison to heat cramps, sickling cramps are less intense in terms of pain and have a weakness and fatigue associated with them, as opposed to tightly contracted muscles that lock up during heat cramps.

A sickling collapse comes on slowly, following cramps, weakness, general body aches and fatigue. Individuals with known positive sickle cell trait status experiencing significant muscle weakness or fatigue during exercise should take extra time to recover and hydrate before returning to activity in order to prevent further symptoms.

A collapse can be prevented by taking steps to ensure sufficient oxygen levels in the blood. Among these preventative measures are proper hydration and gradual acclimation to conditions such as heat, humidity, and decreased air pressure due to higher altitude. Gradual progression of exertion levels also helps athletes' bodies adjust and compensate, gaining fitness slowly over the course of several weeks.

== See also ==
- Ryan Clark (American football)
