= Shaye Lynne Haver =

US Army Ranger School graduate (born 1990)

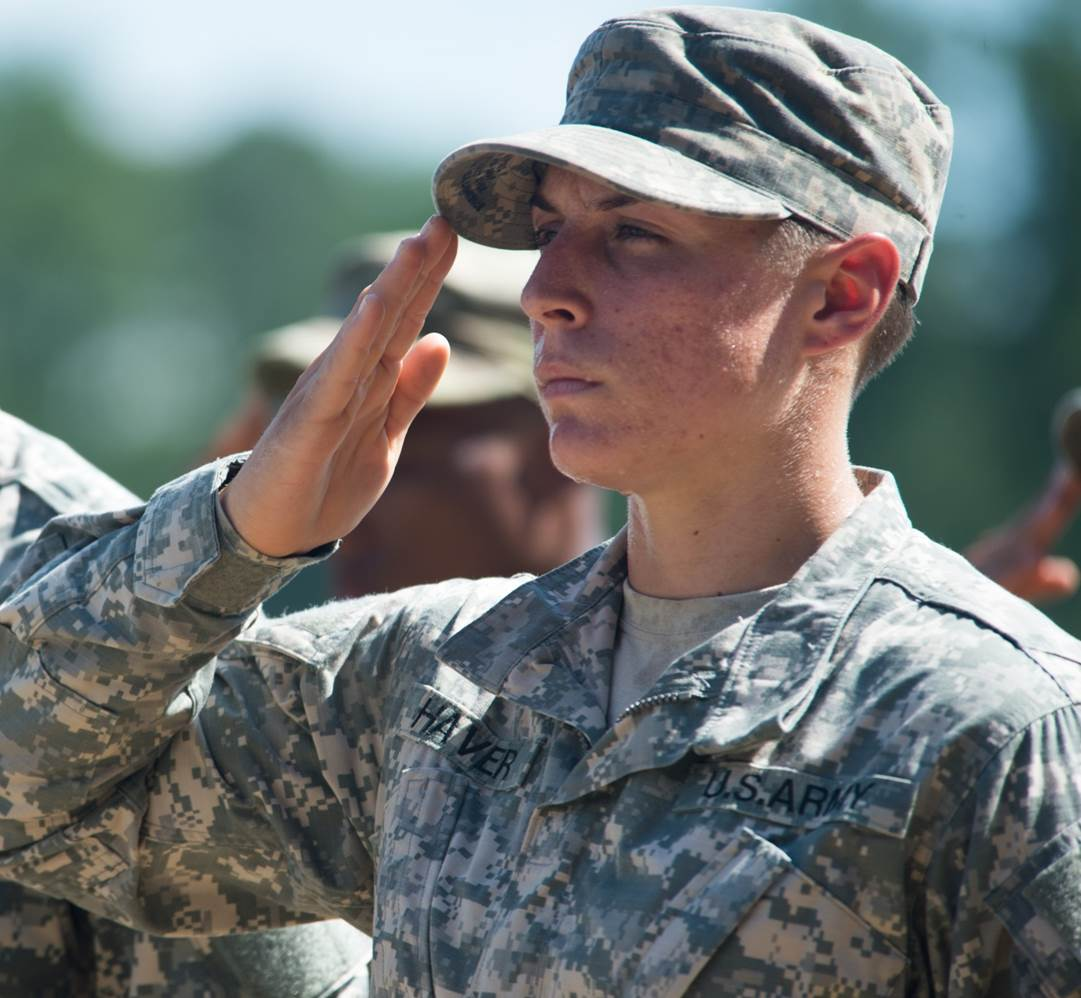
- Born: 1990 (age 35–36)
- Military career
- Allegiance: United States of America
- Branch: United States Army; Infantry
- Service years: 2012–present
- Rank: Major
- Commands: C Company, 1st Battalion, 508th Infantry Regiment; D Company 1st Battalion, 3rd Infantry Regiment
- Awards: Bronze Star; Ranger Tab

Shaye Lynne Haver (born 1990) is one of the two first women, along with CPT Kristen Griest, to ever graduate from the US Army Ranger School, which took place on 21 August 2015. Haver and Griest were ranked 34th on Fortune magazine's 2016 list of the World's Greatest Leaders.

== Early life and education ==
Haver is from Copperas Cove, Texas. In 2008, she graduated from Copperas Cove High School, where she was a cross country runner and soccer player. Haver also participated in the Junior Reserve Officers' Training Corps, where she was reportedly the cadet battalion commander.

Haver graduated from the United States Military Academy in 2012.

Haver followed in her father's footsteps and became a pilot of attack helicopters. Her father also served as a career Army aviator who flew Apaches.

== Military career ==
Having previously served as an Apache attack helicopter pilot in an aviation brigade, Haver is one of the two first women (along with Kristen Marie Griest) to have earned a Ranger tab from the US Army Ranger School. Haver was among a group of 19 women who qualified to attend the first gender-integrated Ranger School, which began 20 April 2015. She received a certificate of completion and was awarded and authorized to wear the Ranger Tab on 21 August 2015.

Haver and Griest both said that they felt extra pressure to succeed because they wanted to prove that women can endure the same stress and pressure that men do when training. Since questions arose about the legitimacy of the program, many commanders and generals have spoken out in support of the women. Major General Scott Miller, the commanding general of the U.S. Army Maneuver Center of Excellence at Fort Benning, said he vowed before the program began that there "would be no change to the standards". Some critics argued that because Haver and her classmate Griest recycled, or started over, they were given special treatment or somehow didn't meet the same standards as male Rangers. School officials reassured the public that approximately 1 in 4 males graduate Ranger School without a recycle.

On 26 April 2018 Haver took command of Co C, 1st Battalion, 508th Parachute Infantry Regiment of the 3rd Brigade, 82nd Airborne Division, joining her fellow Ranger School graduate Griest in being some of the first female infantry commanders.

When US Supreme Court Justice Ruth Bader Ginsburg died and lay in state at the US Capitol, Haver led the military honor guard that carried the casket.

As of 2023, Haver is a major assigned to the 3rd Infantry Regiment (The Old Guard) in Washington, DC.

== Honors ==
In 2018, CPT Haver was inducted into the US Army Women's Foundation Hall of Fame.

== Awards and decorations ==
Personal decorations
	Bronze Star Medal
	Meritorious Service Medal with one Bronze Oak Leaf Cluster
Width-44 myrtle green ribbon with width-3 white stripes at the edges and five width-1 stripes down the center; the central white stripes are width-2 apart	Army Commendation Medal
Width-44 ribbon with two width-9 ultramarine blue stripes surrounded by two pairs of two width-4 green stripes; all these stripes are separated by width-2 white borders	Army Achievement Medal with two Bronze Oak Leaf Clusters
	National Defense Service Medal
	Afghanistan Campaign Medal with one campaign phase Service Star
	Global War on Terrorism Service Medal
	Army Service Ribbon

Other accoutrements
Expert Infantryman Badge
U.S. Army Aviator badge
Senior Parachutist Badge
Air Assault Badge
Pathfinder Badge
Ranger Tab
508th Infantry Regiment distinctive unit insignia
Gold German Military Proficiency Badge
