= Kristen Marie Griest =

One of the two first women to ever graduate from the US Army Ranger School

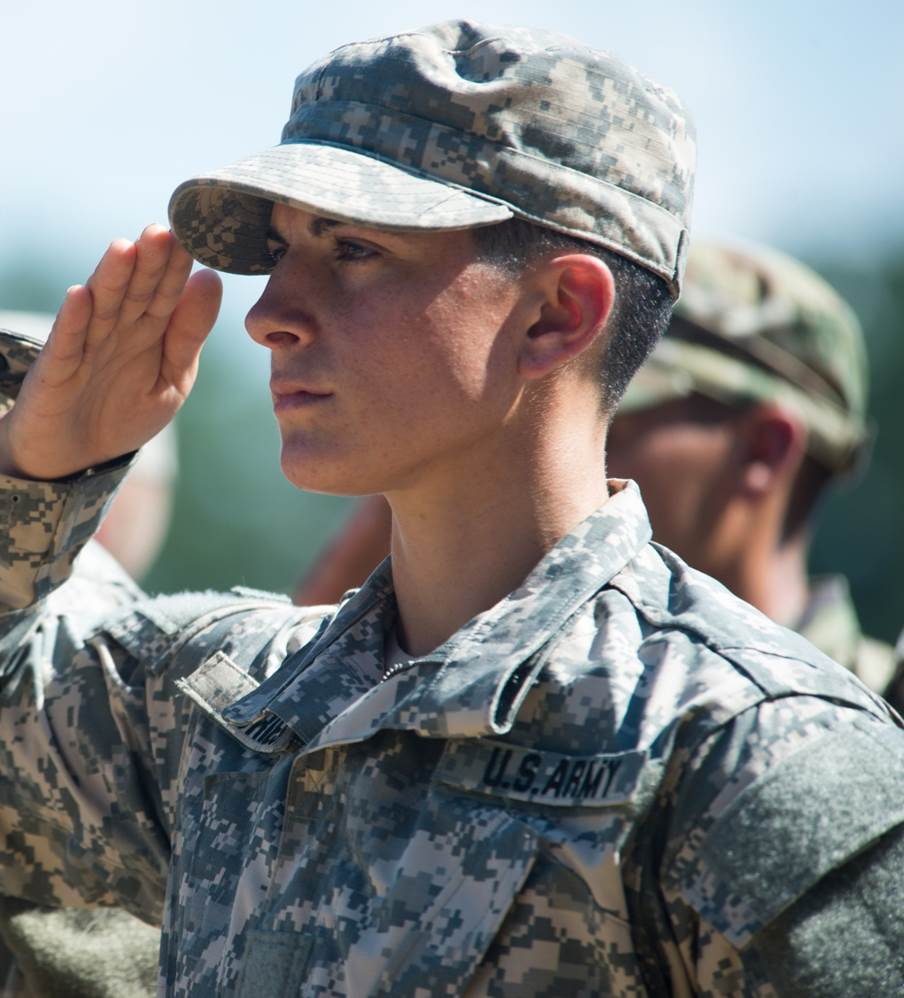
- Born: October 2, 1989 (age 37)
- Military career
- Allegiance: United States
- Branch: United States Army; Infantry
- Service years: 2011–present
- Rank: Major
- Commands: Bravo Company, 2nd Battalion, 505th Parachute Infantry Regiment
- Awards: Ranger

Kristen Marie Griest (born October 2, 1989) is one of the two first women, along with Shaye Lynne Haver, to graduate from the United States Army Ranger School, which occurred on 21 August 2015. Griest and Haver were ranked 34th on Fortune magazine's 2016 list of the World's Greatest Leaders. In April 2016, Griest became the first female infantry officer in the US Army when the Army approved her request to transfer there from a military police unit.

== Early life and education ==
Griest attended Amity Regional High School in Woodbridge, Connecticut, where she ran cross country and track. She graduated from the United States Military Academy at West Point in 2011 with a Bachelor of Science degree in International Relations. In 2022, she earned a Master's degree in Socio-Organizational Psychology from Columbia University.

== Military career ==
Griest graduated from the United States Military Academy in 2011 and commissioned into the Military Police branch of the U.S. Army. She served as a Platoon Leader in the 4th Brigade Combat Team, 101st Airborne Division (AASLT) at Fort Campbell, Kentucky, from 2011 to 2014, including a deployment to Afghanistan in 2013.

Griest began Ranger training in the spring of 2015 as part of a one-time pilot program to see how women would do in Ranger School. She started the course with 380 men and 19 other women, marking the first time women have ever been allowed to participate through the course. 99 men and 2 women graduated from this starting pool. The third woman repeated the mountain phase. The three of them began training with Ranger Class 08–15. Haver and Griest failed the first phase of the course twice, though their performance impressed Ranger leaders enough to be offered a chance to start over from day one, commonly referred to as a "Day 01" recycle. They admitted to press that it was hard to start over, but said they weren't going to quit. "We decided right then and there that if that was what it was going to take to get our Tab, that's what it was going to take," Haver said. School officials report that in addition to Haver and Griest, five male candidates were also offered to start over the course from day one; one in four candidates completed Ranger school without a recycle.

Upon graduating Ranger School, Haver remarked, "It's pretty cool that they have accepted (Griest and Haver). We ourselves came to Ranger School skeptical, with our guards up, just in case there were haters and naysayers. But we didn't come with a chip on our shoulder like we had anything to prove. Becoming one of the teammates—that we could be trusted just like everyone else—whether it was on patrol or to carry something heavy or whatever—it was that every single time we accomplished something it gave us an extra foothold in being part of a team. I can say that without a doubt that the team that I am graduating with tomorrow accept me completely as a Ranger, and I couldn't be more proud and humbled by the experience." Griest made a statement agreeing with this sentiment, saying, "My main concern in coming to Ranger School was I might not be able to carry as much weight or not be able to meet up to the same standard," she said. "I tried to do as much as I could, and I saw everybody else helping each other out and you just try to be the best teammate that you can."

At that time, women were not allowed to serve in Ranger/Infantry roles due to the Pentagon's exclusion policies on women in combat. That policy changed on 3 December 2015 when Secretary of Defense Ash Carter announced the United States military would open combat positions to women with no exception.

Upon graduating from the Maneuver Captains Career Course (MCCC), she took command of Bravo Company, 2nd Battalion, 505th Parachute Infantry Regiment on April 7, 2017. She deployed to Afghanistan in 2019. As of April 2022, Griest was a student at Columbia University, where she was pursuing a master’s degree in Socio-Organizational Psychology, with plans for a follow-on assignment as a West Point Tactical Officer. She was promoted to major in May 2022.

Following the election of Donald Trump and confirmation of Secretary of Defense Pete Hegseth, all references to Griest's accomplishments - which had been frequently cited in Army social media posts and other publicity materials - were erased, pursuant to an order from Secretary Hegseth that "all the military services eliminate online material not allowed by the Trump administration."

== Honors ==
In 2018, CPT Griest was inducted into the United States Army Women's Foundation Hall of Fame.

== Misuse of name ==
Griest's name has been used fraudulently on phishing email messages unconnected with her, both dating scams and financial scams about billions of United States dollars missing in Iraq.

== Awards and decorations ==
Personal decorations
	Bronze Star Medal
Width-44 myrtle green ribbon with width-3 white stripes at the edges and five width-1 stripes down the center; the central white stripes are width-2 apart	Army Commendation Medal
	National Defense Service Medal
	Afghanistan Campaign Medal
	Global War on Terrorism Service Medal
	Army Service Ribbon
	NATO Medal for ex-Yugoslavia

Other accoutrements
Expert Infantryman Badge
Parachutist Badge
Air Assault Badge
Ranger Tab
101st Airborne Division Combat Service Identification Badge
505th Infantry Regiment distinctive unit insignia
Gold German Military Proficiency Badge
1 Overseas Service Bar
