= War crimes in the Korean War =

Mass killings during Korean war

The Korean War was a major conflict of the Cold War and among the most destructive conflicts of the modern era, with approximately 3 million killed, most of whom were civilians. It resulted in the destruction of virtually all of Korea's major cities, with thousands of massacres committed by both sides, including the mass killing of civilians by the North Korean communists and the mass killing of civilians by the South Korean government. North Korea became among the most heavily bombed countries in history.

== Civilian deaths and massacres ==
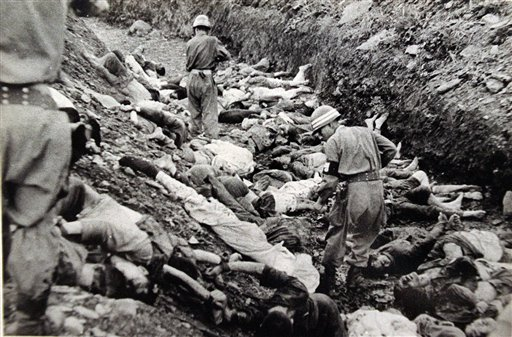
South Korean soldiers walk among the bodies of political prisoners executed near Daejon, July 1950

Around 3 million people died in the Korean War, the majority of whom were civilians, making it possibly the deadliest conflict of the Cold War era. Although only rough estimates of civilian fatalities are available, scholars from Guenter Lewy to Bruce Cumings, have noted that the percentage of civilian casualties in Korea was higher than in World War II or the Vietnam War, with Cumings estimated civilian casualties to be at 2 million and Lewy estimating civilian deaths to be in the range of 2 million to 3 million.

Cumings states that civilians represent at least half of the war's casualties, while Lewy suggests that the civilian portion of the death toll may have gone as high as 70%, compared to Lewy's estimates of 42% in World War II and 30%–46% in the Vietnam War. Data compiled by the Peace Research Institute Oslo lists just under 1 million battle deaths over the course of the Korean War (with a range of 644,696 to 1.5 million) and a mid-value estimate of 3 million total deaths (with a range of 1.5 million to 4.5 million), attributing the difference to excess mortality among civilians from one-sided massacres, starvation, and disease. Compounding this devastation for Korean civilians, virtually all major cities on the Korean Peninsula were destroyed as a result of the war. In both per capita and absolute terms, North Korea was the country most devastated by the war. According to Charles K. Armstrong, the war resulted in the death of an estimated 12%–15% of the North Korean population (c. 10 million), "a figure close to or surpassing the proportion of Soviet citizens killed in World War II".

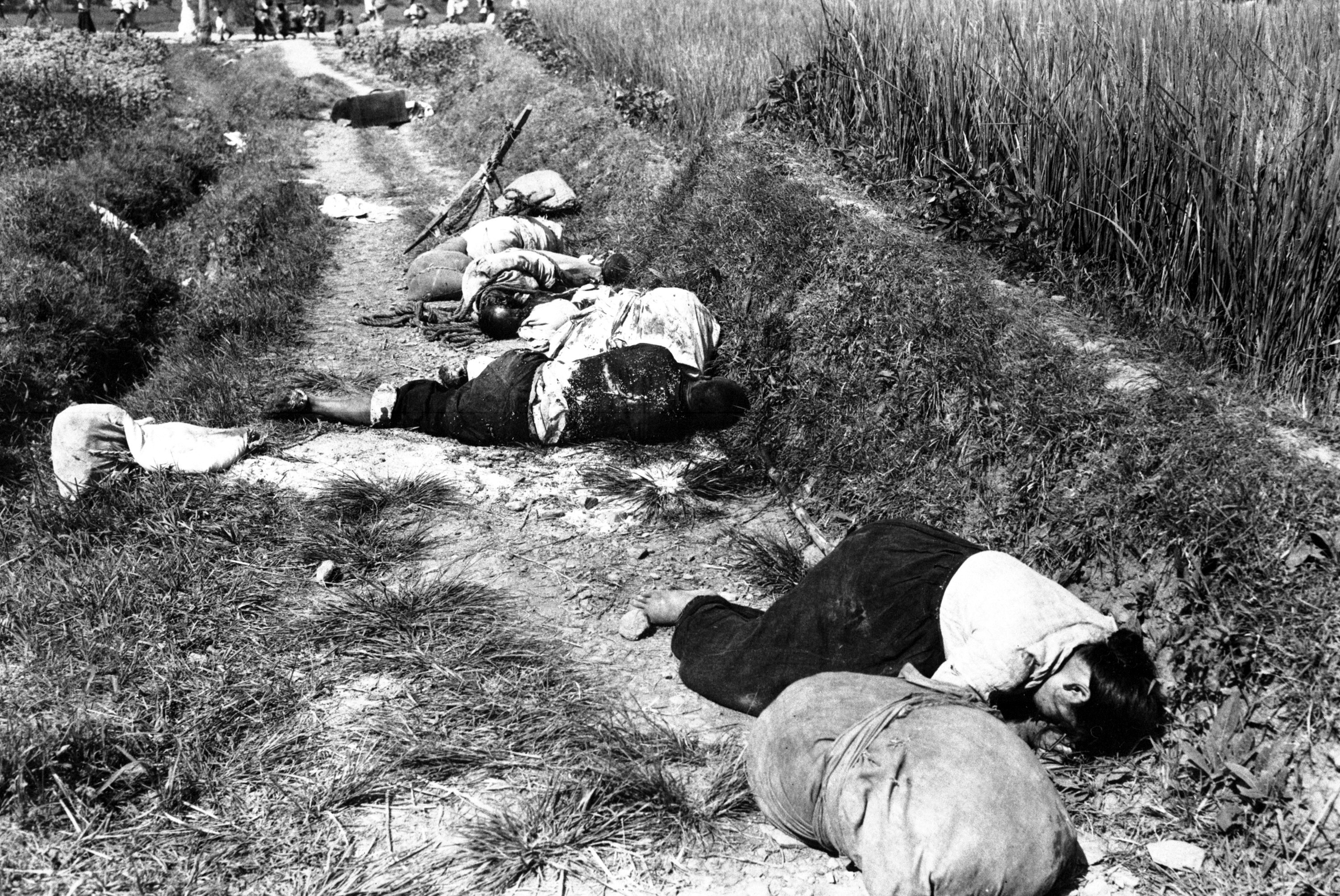
Civilians killed during a night battle near Yongsan, August 1950

There were numerous atrocities and massacres of civilians throughout the Korean War committed by both sides, starting in the war's first days. In 2005–2010, a South Korean Truth and Reconciliation Commission investigated atrocities and other human rights violations through much of the 20th century, from the Japanese colonial period through the Korean War and beyond. It excavated some mass graves from the Bodo League massacres and confirmed the general outlines of those political executions. Of the Korean War-era massacres the commission was petitioned to investigate, 82% were perpetrated by South Korean forces, with 18% perpetrated by North Korean forces. This investigation focused on uncovering previously unreported massacres carried out by the South Korean military.

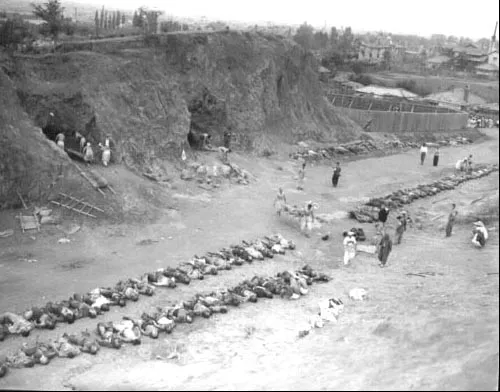
North Korean prisoners of war are exhuming the bodies of massacre victims who were buried by North Korean forces in Hamhung.

The massacres committed by North Korea were not collective but rather sporadic yet frequently carried out across the country. The number of victims caused by North Korea is estimated to be in the hundreds of thousands. The massacres committed by North Korea were carried out through public executions using "people's trials." After the Inchon Landing, during their retreat, they are known to have carried out mass killings of numerous civilians, including many intellectuals. This trend was particularly severe in areas north of the 38th parallel. During their retreat, North Korean forces committed massacres in major northern cities such as Pyongyang and Hamhung.

The commission also received petitions alleging more than 200 large-scale killings of South Korean civilians by the U.S. military during the war, mostly air attacks. It confirmed several such cases, including refugees crowded into a cave attacked with napalm bombs, which survivors said killed 360 people, and an air attack that killed 197 refugees gathered in a field in the far south. It recommended South Korea seek reparations from the United States, but in 2010, a reorganized commission under a new, conservative government concluded that most U.S. mass killings resulted from "military necessity", while in a small number of cases, they concluded, the U.S. military had acted with "low levels of unlawfulness", but the commission recommended against seeking reparations.

== Bombing of North Korea ==
Pyongyang in May 1951

The initial bombing attack on North Korea was approved on the fourth day of the war, 29 June 1950, by General Douglas MacArthur immediately upon request by the Commanding General of the Far East Air Forces (FEAF), George E. Stratemeyer. Major bombing began in late July. U.S. airpower conducted 7,000 close support and interdiction airstrikes that month, which helped slow the North Korean rate of advance to 3 km (2 mi) per day. On 12 August 1950, the USAF dropped 625 tons of bombs on North Korea; two weeks later, the daily tonnage increased to some 800 tons.

The United States dropped a total of 635,000 tons of bombs, including 32,557 tons of napalm, on Korea, more than during the entire Pacific War. Napalm is an extremely flammable gelatinous liquid which contains materials such as aluminum salts, polystyrene, and benzene (all highly combustive). North Korea ranks alongside Cambodia (500,000 tons), Laos (2 million tons) and South Vietnam (4 million tons) as among the most heavily bombed countries in history, with Laos suffering the most extensive bombardment relative to its size and population.

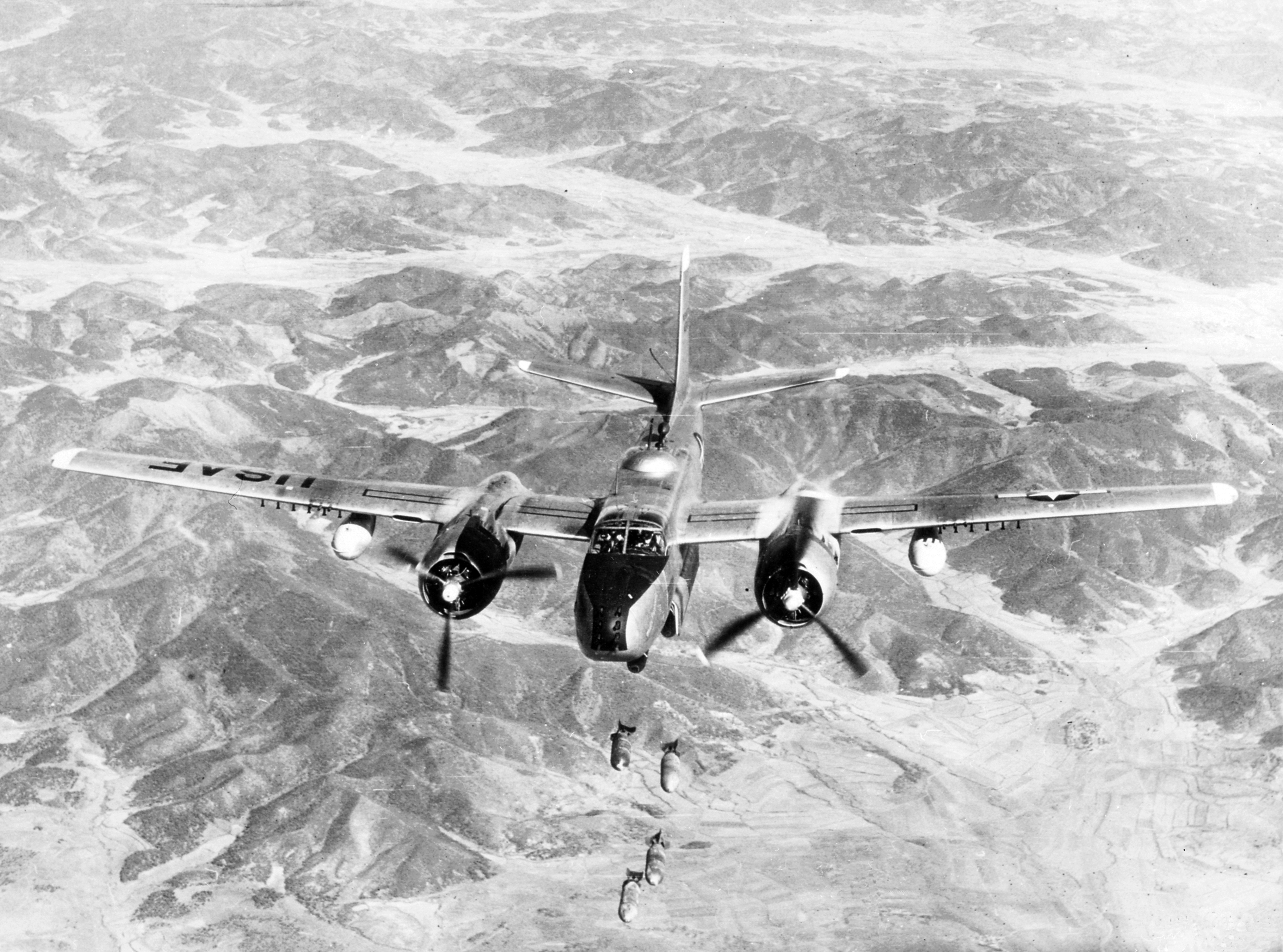
A USAF Douglas B-26B Invader of the 452nd Bombardment Wing bombing a target in North Korea, 29 May 1951

Almost every substantial building in North Korea was destroyed as a result. The war's highest-ranking American POW, Major General William F. Dean, reported that the majority of North Korean cities and villages he saw were either rubble or snow-covered wasteland. North Korean factories, schools, hospitals, and government offices were forced to move underground, and air defenses were "non-existent". In May 1953, five major North Korean dams were bombed. According to Charles K. Armstrong, the bombing of these dams and ensuing floods threatened several million North Koreans with starvation, although large-scale famine was averted with emergency aid provided by North Korea's allies. General Matthew Ridgway said that except for air power, "the war would have been over in 60 days with all Korea in Communist hands". United Nations Command air forces flew 1,040,708 combat and combat support sorties during the Korean War. The FEAF flew the majority the majority of sorties at 710,886 (69.3% of sorties), with the U.S. Navy performing 16.1%, the U.S. Marine Corps 10.3%, and 4.3% by other allied air forces.

As well as conventional bombing, the communist side claimed that the U.S. used biological weapons. These claims have been disputed; Conrad Crane asserts that while the United States worked towards developing chemical and biological weapons, the U.S. military "possessed neither the ability, nor the will," to use them in combat.

In the eyes of North Koreans, as well as some observers, the deliberate targeting of civilian infrastructure (which resulted in the destruction of cities and a high civilian death count) was a war crime. Cumings has compared the American bombing to genocide.

== Abuse of prisoners of war ==
=== Chinese POWs ===
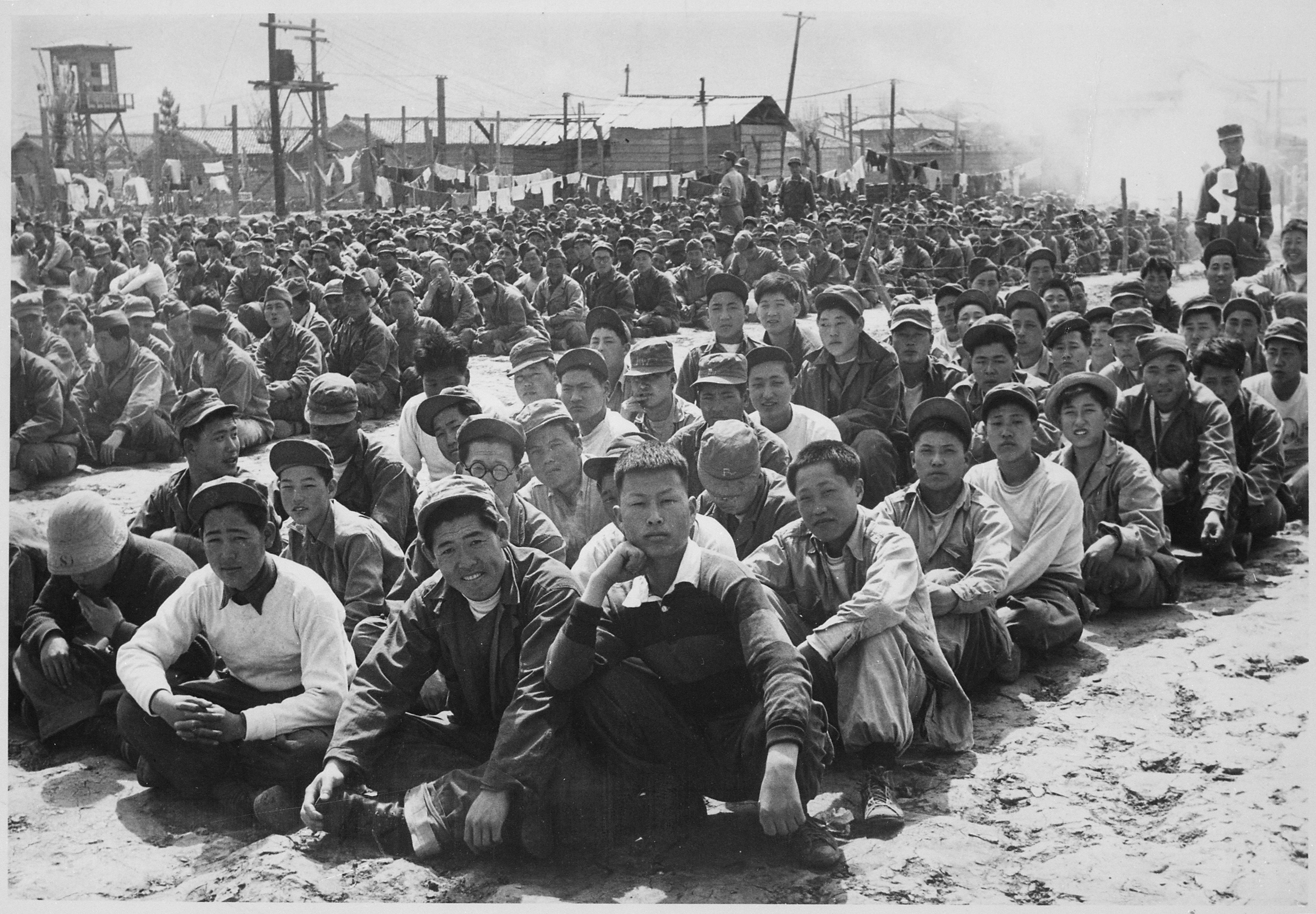
North Korean and Chinese prisoners of war in a camp at Busan in April 1951

Chinese sources claim at Geoje prison camp on Geoje Island, Chinese POWs experienced anti-communist lecturing and missionary work from secret agents from the U.S. and Taiwan. Pro-communist POWs experienced torture, cutting off of limbs, or were executed in public. Being forced to write confession letters and receiving tattoos of an anti-communism slogan and flag of the Republic of China were also commonly seen, in case any wanted to go back to mainland China. Pro-communist POWs who could not endure the torture formed an underground group to fight the pro-nationalist POWs secretly by assassination, which led to the Geoje uprising. The rebellion captured Francis Dodd, and was suppressed by the 187th Infantry Regiment.

In the end, 14,235 Chinese POWs went to Taiwan and fewer than 6,000 POWs returned to mainland China. Those who went to Taiwan are called "righteous men" and experienced brainwashing again and were sent to the army or were arrested; while the survivors who returned to mainland China were welcomed as a "hero" first, but experienced anti-brainwashing, strict interrogation, and house arrest eventually, after the tattoos were discovered. After 1988, the Taiwanese government allowed POWs to go back to mainland China and helped remove anti-communist tattoos; while the mainland Chinese government started to allow mainland Chinese prisoners of war to return from Taiwan.

=== UN Command POWs ===
The United States reported that North Korea mistreated prisoners of war: soldiers were beaten, tortured, starved, put to forced labor, marched to death, and summarily executed.

The KPA killed POWs at the battles for Hill 312, Hill 303, the Pusan Perimeter, Daejeon and Sunchon; these massacres were discovered afterwards by the UN forces. Later, a U.S. Congress war crimes investigation, the United States Senate Subcommittee on Korean War Atrocities of the Permanent Subcommittee of the Investigations of the Committee on Government Operations, reported that "two-thirds of all American prisoners of war in Korea died as a result of war crimes".

Although the Chinese rarely executed prisoners of war like their North Korean counterparts, mass starvation and diseases swept through the Chinese-run POW camps during the winter of 1950–51. About 43% of U.S. POWs died during this period. The Chinese defended their actions by stating that all Chinese soldiers during this period were suffering mass starvation and diseases because of logistical difficulties. The UN POWs said that most of the Chinese camps were located near the easily supplied Sino-Korean border and that the Chinese withheld food to force the prisoners to accept the communism indoctrination programs. According to Chinese reports, over a thousand U.S. POWs died by the end of June 1951, while a dozen British POWs died, and all Turkish POWs survived. According to Hastings, wounded U.S. POWs died for lack of medical attention and were fed a diet of corn and millet "devoid of vegetables, almost barren of proteins, minerals, or vitamins" with only one-third of the calories of their usual diet. Especially in early 1951, thousands of prisoners lost the will to live and "declined to eat the mess of sorghum and rice they were provided".

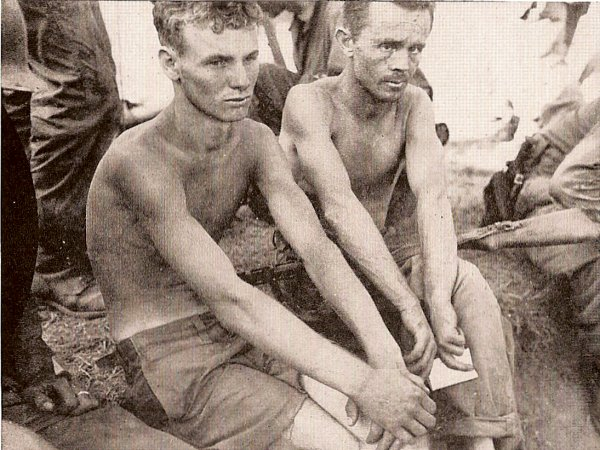
Two Hill 303 survivors after being rescued by U.S. units, 17 August 1950

The unpreparedness of U.S. POWs to resist heavy communist indoctrination during the Korean War led to the Code of the United States Fighting Force which governs how U.S. military personnel in combat should act when they must "evade capture, resist while a prisoner or escape from the enemy".

North Korea may have detained up to 50,000 South Korean POWs after the ceasefire. Over 88,000 South Korean soldiers were missing and the KPA claimed they captured 70,000 South Koreans. However, when ceasefire negotiations began in 1951, the KPA reported they held only 8,000 South Koreans. The United Nations Command protested the discrepancies and alleged that the KPA were forcing South Korean POWs to join the KPA. The KPA denied such allegations. They claimed their POW rosters were small because many POWs were killed in UN air raids and that they had released ROK soldiers at the front. They insisted only volunteers were allowed to serve in the KPA. By early 1952, UN negotiators gave up trying to get back the missing South Koreans. The POW exchange proceeded without access to South Korean POWs who were not on the PVA/KPA rosters.

North Korea continued to claim that any South Korean POW who stayed in the North did so voluntarily. However, since 1994, South Korean POWs have been escaping North Korea on their own after decades of captivity. As of 2010, the South Korean Ministry of Unification reported that 79 South Korean POWs escaped the North. The South Korean government estimates 500 South Korean POWs continue to be detained in North Korea. The escaped POWs have testified about their treatment and written memoirs about their lives in North Korea. They report they were not told about the POW exchange procedures and were assigned to work in mines in the remote northeastern regions near the Chinese and Russian border. Declassified Soviet Foreign Ministry documents corroborate such testimony.

== National Defense Corps incident ==
In December 1950, the South Korean National Defense Corps was founded; the soldiers were 406,000 drafted citizens. In the winter of 1951, 50,000 to 90,000 South Korean National Defense Corps soldiers starved to death while marching southward under the PVA offensive when their commanding officers embezzled funds earmarked for their food. This event is called the National Defense Corps Incident. Although his political allies certainly profited from corruption, it remains controversial if Syngman Rhee was personally involved in or benefited from the corruption.
