= Rémy Gorgé =

Swiss peacekeeper

Rémy Gorgé (18 June 1923 – 20 December 2015) was a Swiss national whose career in international peacekeeping with the United Nations spanned more than three decades.

He served as senior and Principal Legal Advisor to various United Nations bodies involved in peacekeeping operations (see below) and also undertook numerous special peacekeeping missions on behalf of the incumbent Secretary General at the time; primarily relating to political disturbances in Cyprus, Iraq and Iran and, the Middle East in General (see below).

== Timeline of Different Roles ==
1947 Doctor iuris utriusque, magna cum laude University of Berne, Switzerland

1947 International Committee of the Red Cross, Geneva

1948-1952 International Refugee Organization, Geneva Legal advisor (1948 – 1950) Deputy General Council (1951 – 1952)

1952 – 1953 Inter-Governmental Committee for European Migration, general Acting General Counsel

1953 – 1956 United Nations Korean Reconstruction Agency, New York Senior Legal Adviser (also in charge of chartering and investments)

1956 – 1957 United Nations Truce Supervision Organization (Palestine) Jerusalem Senior Legal Adviser

1958 – 1959 United Nations Emergency Force, Gaza Senior Legal and Political Adviser

1960 Legal Affairs, United Nations Headquarters, New York Senior Legal Officer

1960 – 1963 International Atomic Energy Agency, Vienna Senior Legal Adviser

1963 – 1964 United Nations Operations Congo, Leopoldville Principal Legal Adviser and Political Adviser

1965 International Atomic Energy Agency, Vienna Senior Legal Officer

1965 – 1971 United Nations Peace-Keeping Force in Cyprus (UNFICYP) Senior Legal and Political Adviser

1971 – 1973 United Nations Truce Supervision Organization, Jerusalem Principal Political Adviser

1973-1974 United Nations Emergency Force, Cairo Principal Political Adviser

1974 - United Nations Peace-Keeping Force in Cyprus (UNFICYP) Senior Political and Legal Adviser

1978 Acting Special Representative of the Secretary-General in Cyprus

1978 – 1981 Deputy Special Representative of the Secretary-General in Cyprus

Special Missions

1960 Legal Adviser of the United Nations Tin Conference, New York

1961 Legal Adviser of the United Nations Sugar Conference, Geneva

1962 Legal Adviser to Special Representatives of United Nations Secretary-General at talks between Messrs. Adoula and Tschombe, Leopoldville

1963 Legal Adviser of the United Nations Sugar Conference, London

1964 Representative of the United Nations Secretary-General on joint mission with representative of the High Commissioner for Refugees, Burundi, Rwanda and Kivu (Congo)

1965 Legal Adviser at United Nations Tin Conference, New York

1970 Member of Secretariat Mission to Guinea, appointed by the Secretary-General (Cancelled by Government of Guinea before arrival in mission area)

1972 Aide to United Nations Under-Secretary-General for Special Political Affairs in consultations with Greek and Turkish Governments

1973 Aide to United Nations Under-Secretary-General for Special Political Affairs in consultations with Syrian and Israeli Governments

1974 Aide to United Nations Under-Secretary-General for Special Political Affairs at Geneva Conference on Cyprus

1975 – 1980 Number of Missions to Greece and Turkey, accompanying Special Representative of the Secretary-General and, in January 1978, the Secretary-General of the United Nations

1980 – 1981 Peace Missions to Iraq and Iran, accompanying Prime Minister Olof Palme, United Nations Special Representative

1982 Special missions (2) for Secretary-General of the United Nations to Lebanon and Israel during hostilities.
