= Geoje POW camp =

Prisoner of war camp

Coordinates: 34.8758202°N 128.6242828°E

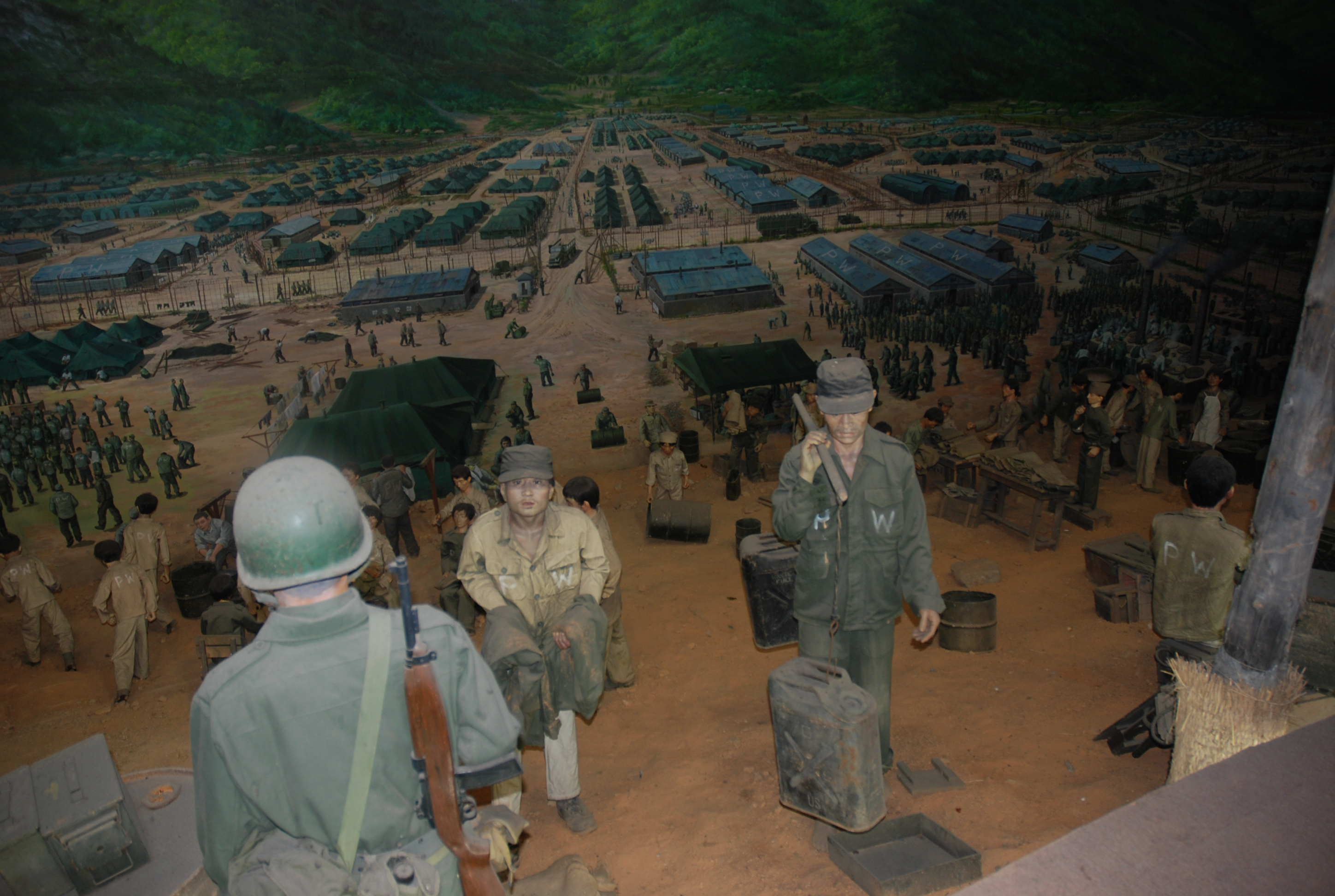
Geoje POW camp diorama

Geoje-do POW camp (Korean: 거제도 포로수용소/巨濟島 捕虜收容所, Chinese: 巨济岛战俘营) was a prisoner of war camp located on Geoje island at the southernmost part of Gyeongsangnam-do, South Korea. It is considered the largest of the UNC established camps.

Geoje Camp was a United Nations Command (UN) POW camp that held North Korean and Chinese prisoners captured by UN forces during the Korean War.

== History ==
After the surprise Inchon landings on 15 September 1950 and the follow-up Eighth Army breakout from the Pusan Perimeter, the North Korean Korean People's Army (KPA) began to retreat north pursued by UN forces in the UN September 1950 counteroffensive. Large numbers of KPA were taken prisoner in the swift maneuver and sent to the rear. The number of prisoners rose from under 1,000 in August 1950 to over 130,000 in November. Unfortunately, little provision had been made for so many prisoners and facilities to confine, clothe and feed them were not available. In addition, there were not enough men on hand to guard the prisoners nor were the guards assigned adequately trained for their mission. The quantity and quality of the security forces continued to plague the UN prison-camp commanders in the months that lay ahead. While the prisoners were housed near Pusan, there was a tendency for former Republic of Korea Army (ROK) soldiers who had been impressed into the KPA and later recaptured by the UN to take over the leadership in the compounds. Since these ex-ROK soldiers professed themselves to be anti-Communist and were usually favored by the ROK guards, they were able to win positions of power and control.

As the prisoner total reached 137,000 in January 1951, the UN decided to isolate captured personnel on Geoje-do, an island off the southern coast of Korea. But before the move was made, the South Korean prisoners were segregated from the North Koreans. This left a power vacuum in many of the compounds that were abruptly deprived of their leaders. On Geoje, security problems were reduced, but there were serious engineering obstacles to be overcome. Since there were little or no natural water resources on the island, Colonel Hartley F. Dame, the first camp commander, had to build dams and store rainwater to service the 118,000 locals, 100,000 refugees, and 150,000 prisoners. Construction began in January on the first enclosure of UN Prisoner of War Camp Number 1 and by the end of the month over 50,000 POW's were moved from the mainland to Geoje. Swiftly, in two rock-strewn valleys on the north coast, four enclosures, each subdivided into eight compounds, were built. Originally intended to hold 700–1,200 men apiece, the compounds were soon jammed to five times their capacity. Since available land was at a premium on the island, the space between the compounds soon had to be used to confine the prisoners too. This conserved the construction of facilities and the number of guards required to police the enclosures, but complicated the task of managing the crowded camp. Packing thousands of men into a small area with only barbed wire separating each compound from the next permitted a free exchange of thought and an opportunity to plan and execute mass demonstrations and riots. With the number of security personnel limited and usually of inferior caliber, proper control was difficult at the outset and later became impossible. But the elusive hope of an imminent armistice and a rapid solution of the prisoner problem delayed corrective action.

Although there were frequent instances of unrest and occasional outbreaks of resistance during the first months of the Geoje POW camp's existence, much of the early trouble could be traced to the fact that ROK guards were used extensively. Resentment between ROK and KPA soldiers flared into angry words, threats, and blows very easily. Part of the tension stemmed from the circumstance that at first the prisoners drew better rations than the guards, but eventually this discrepancy was adjusted. In the internecine disputes the United States Army (US) security troops operated at a disadvantage since they knew little or no Korean language and were reluctant to interfere. Bad blood between guards and prisoners, however, formed only one segment of the problem. Although the United States had not ratified the Geneva Convention of 1949 on prisoners of war, it had volunteered to observe its provisions. The Geneva Convention, however, was designed primarily to protect the rights of the prisoners. It completely failed to foresee the development of organized prisoner groups such as those that grew up on Geoje in 1951–52 or to provide protection for the captor nation(s) in dealing with stubborn resistance. The drafters spelled out in detail the privileges of the prisoners and the restrictions upon the captor nation(s), but evidently could not visualize a situation in which the prisoners would organize and present an active threat to the captor nation(s). Under these conditions, every effort at violence by the prisoners that was countered by force reflected badly upon the UN command. Regardless of the provocation given by the prisoners, the UN appeared to be an armed bully abusing the defenseless captives and the Communists capitalized on this situation. The outbreaks of dissension and open resistance were desultory until the negotiations at Kaesong got underway. Then the prisoners realized that their future was at stake. Many had professed strong anti-Communist sentiments and were afraid to return, while others, anticipating repatriation, swung clearly to the side of Communist groups in the compounds. From North Korea, agents were sent to the front lines and permitted themselves to be captured so that they could infiltrate the POW camps. Working through refugees, civilians, and local guerrillas, the agents were able to keep in touch with their headquarters and to plan, organize, and stage incidents at will. Inside the camps, messages were passed visually by signals, hurled by rocks from compound to compound, or communicated by word of mouth. The hospital compound served as a clearinghouse for information and was one of the centers of Communist resistance. Although the agents wielded the actual power in the compounds, they usually concealed themselves behind the nominal commanders and operated carefully to cloak their identities. Behind the agents stood their chiefs, Lieutenant general Nam Il and Major general Lee Sang Cho, the principal KPA delegates to the armistice conference. The close connection between the Armistice negotiations and the POW camps showed the North Korean efforts in using every possible measure to exert pressure upon the course of the armistice talks.

As the Communists struggled for control of the compounds, a countermovement was launched by the non-Communist elements. Former Chinese Nationalist soldiers and North Korean anti-Communists engaged in bloody clashes with their opponents, using fists and homemade weapons. Kangaroo courts tried stubborn prisoners and sentences were quick and often fatal. Since UN personnel did not enter the compounds at night and the prisoners were usually either afraid or unwilling to talk, the beatings and murders went unpunished. Even if the beaten prisoners had been willing to give evidence against their attackers, as sometimes happened, the camp commander was not in a position to prosecute. He was not permitted by his superiors in Washington D.C. to institute judicial procedures against the culprits. Deprived of this weapon of disciplinary control, the prison command was forced to operate under a distinct disadvantage.

The first collective violence against camp guards occurred on 18/19 June 1951, when some North Korean officers protested having to dig latrines and garbage pits. When a ROK guard detail entered Compound 76 of the camp, the prisoners stoned the guards and the soldiers opened fire, killing three prisoners. More incidents followed including demonstrations within the compounds, work refusals, threats against camp personnel, and some 15 murders among groups of pro- and anti-communist Korean prisoners. In July and August 1951, the guards killed eight more prisoners.

In September 1951, 15 prisoners were murdered by a self-appointed people's court. Three more were killed when rioting broke out on the 19th in Compound 78. Troops had to be rushed in to restore order and remove 200 prisoners who were in fear of their lives. As unrest mounted, the US 2nd Logistical Command, in charge of all POW camps, asked US Eighth Army commander General James Van Fleet for more security personnel. Referring to protracted confinement, uncertainty over the future, and prisoner resistance against the UN "information and education program" and claiming these factors had combined to produce increasing tension among the prisoners, the chief of staff of the 2d Logistical Command also reminded Van Fleet that the caliber of the guard troops left much to be desired. The September disturbances led to a visit by Van Fleet and a reinforcing and reorganization of the prison security forces. From the opening of the camp in January down to mid-September when Colonel Maurice J. Fitzgerald assumed command, there had been eight different commanders or about one a month. As Fitzgerald later commented, "Koje-do was a graveyard of commanders." Van Fleet's recognition of the difficulties of the problems led to the activation of the 8137th Military Police Group in October. Besides three assigned battalions, four additional escort guard companies were attached to the group. In November one battalion of the US 23rd Infantry Regiment was made available for duty on Geoje and by December over 9,000 US and ROK personnel were stationed on the island. This was still some 6,000 fewer than the number requested.

=== Screening and indoctrination ===
During December the rival factions, Communist and anti-Communist, vied for control of the compounds with both sides meting out beatings and other punishment freely. A large-scale rock fight between compounds on 18 December was followed by riots and demonstrations. Fourteen deaths and 24 other casualties resulted from this flare-up. The acceleration of violence could be attributed in large part to the inauguration of the screening process in the POW camps. General Yount, commanding the 2nd Logistical Command, later told the Far East commander: "Until the inception of the screening program, American personnel had full access to compounds and were able to administer them in a satisfactory manner although never to the degree desired." In November and December over 37,000 prisoners had been screened and reclassified as civilian internees. As more prisoners indicated that they did not wish to be repatriated or evinced anti-Communist sympathies, the sensitivity of the Communist prisoners to screening intensified.

Another instance in which higher headquarters contributed unwittingly to the discontent of the POW camp stemmed from an information and education program instituted in 1951 to keep the prisoners occupied profitably. By far the greater portion of the education program aimed at assisting the prisoners in developing vocational and technical skills to help them after their release. The Communists readily accepted the instruction in metalworking and soon began to produce weapons of all varieties instead of sanitation utensils, stoves, and garden tools and used these arms to gain interior control in the compounds whenever they could.

From January 1952, the prisoners were exposed to anti-communist propaganda. Syllabi included "How War Came to Korea", "Democracy and Totalitarianism" and "Facts About the United States"., and English courses were also offered. For the Communists, this "orientation course" became the chief target of criticism. These lectures contrasted the "advantages of democracy" with the "fallacies of communism" and the Communists protested vehemently.

By 1952 over 170,000 prisoners of war (about 85% North Korean and the rest from China) were held at the camp. U.N. forces lacked sufficient manpower and experience in controlling such large numbers of prisoners.

From February 1952, at the suggestion of U. Alexis Johnson (Deputy Secretary of State for East Asia), it was planned to check whether the prisoners were willing to return home, without making any specific promises to those who wanted to stay in the "free South". This screening began on 11 April 1952. By 19 April, over 106,000 prisoners had been interviewed by armed interrogation teams in 22 sections of the camp. The latter were usually handcuffed and beaten during the "hearing"; they were supposed to fight on the South Korean side from then on. General Yount ordered that prisoners who did not want to return home should be transferred.

=== Geoje Uprising (February–June 1952) ===
The civilian internee compounds were screened during January and early February except for the 6,500 inmates of Compound 62. Here the Communists had firm control and refused to permit the teams to enter. The compound leader stated flatly that all the members of Compound 62 desired to return to North Korea and there was no sense in wasting time in screening. Since the South Korean teams were equally determined to carry out their assignment, the 3rd Battalion, 27th Infantry Regiment moved in during the early hours of 18 February and took up positions in front of the compound. With bayonets fixed, the four companies passed through the gate and divided the compound into four segments. But the Communists refused to bow to the show of force. Streaming out of the barracks, they converged on the infantry with pick handles, knives, axes, flails, and tent poles. Others hurled rocks as they advanced and screamed their defiance. Between 1,000 and 1,500 internees pressed the attack and the soldiers were forced to resort to concussion grenades. When the grenades failed to stop the assault, the UN troops opened fire. 55 prisoners were killed immediately and 22 more died at the hospital, with over 140 other casualties as against one US soldier killed and 38 wounded. This was a success for the Communists, for the infantry withdrew and the compound was not screened.

The fear that the story might leak out to the Chinese and North Koreans led the UN Command to release an official account placing the blame squarely on the shoulders of the Communist compound leaders. The Department of the Army instructed UN commander General Matthew Ridgway to make it clear that only 1,500 of the inmates took part in the outbreak and that only civilian internees, not prisoners of war, were involved. In view of the outcry that the Communist delegates at Panmunjom were certain to make over the affair, this was an especially important point. Civilian internees could be considered an internal affair of the South Korean Government and outside the purview of the truce conference. But North Korean protests at Panmunjom were not the only results of the battle of Compound 62. On 20 February Van Fleet appointed Brigadier-General Francis Dodd as commandant of the camp to tighten up discipline, and the following week Van Fleet received some new instructions from Tokyo:

In regard to the control of the POW's at Koje-do, the recent riot in Compound 62 gives strong evidence that many of the compounds may be controlled by the violent leadership of Communists or anti-Communist groups. This subversive control is extremely dangerous and can result in further embarrassment to the U.N.C. Armistice negotiations, particularly if any mass screening or segregation is directed within a short period of time. I desire your personal handling of this planning. I wish to point out the grave potential consequences of further rioting, and therefore me urgent requirement for the most effective practicable control over POW's.

Although the orders from Ridgway covered both Communists and anti-Communists, the latter submitted to UN personnel and only used violence against Communist sympathizers in their midst.

The hatred between the two groups led to another bloody encounter on 13 March. As an anti-Communist detail passed a hostile compound, ardent Communists stoned the detail and its ROK guards. Without orders the guards retaliated with gunfire. Before the ROK contingent could be brought under control, 12 prisoners were killed and 26 were wounded while one ROK civilian and one US officer, who tried to stop the shooting, were injured.

On 2 April the North Korean and Chinese negotiators at Panmunjom showed their interest in finding out the exact number of prisoners that would be returned to their control if screening was carried out. Spurred by this indication that the North Korean and Chinese might be willing to break the deadlock on voluntary repatriation, the UN Command inaugurated a new screening program on 8 April to produce a firm figure. During the days that followed, UN teams interviewed the prisoners in all but seven compounds, where 37,000 North Koreans refused to permit the teams to enter. In the end, it was claimed that only about 70,000 of the 170,000 military and civilian prisoners consented to go back to North Korea or China voluntarily. The North Koreans and Chinese were indignant, having been led to expect that a much higher percentage of repatriates would be turned up by the screening. Negotiations at Panmunjom again came to a standstill and the North Korean and Chinese renewed their attack upon the whole concept of screening. In view of the close connection between the enemy truce delegates and the POW camps, it was not surprising that the agitation of the North Korean and Chinese over the unfavorable implications of the UN screening should communicate itself quickly to the loyal Communist compounds. During the interviewing period, Van Fleet had informed Ridgway that he was segregating and removing the anti-Communist prisoners to the mainland. Although the separation would mean more administrative personnel and more equipment would be required to organize and supervise the increased number of camps, Van Fleet felt that dispersal would lessen the possibility of resistance. However, the removal of anti-Communists and their replacement by pro-Communists in the compounds on Geoje eventually strengthened the Communist compound leadership. Relieved of the pressure from nationalist elements, they could now be assured of wholehearted support from the inmates of their compounds as they directed their efforts against the UN command. An energetic campaign to discredit the screening program backed by all the Communist compounds was made easier by the transfer of the chief opposition to the mainland and the alteration of the balance of power on the island.

In addition to the general political unrest that permeated the Communist enclosures, a quite fortuitous element of discontent complicated the scene in early April. Up until this time responsibility for the provision of the grain component of the prisoners' ration had rested with the ROK. But the South Korean Government informed the Eighth Army in March that it could no longer bear the burden and Van Fleet, in turn, told the 2nd Logistical Command that it would have to secure the grain through US Army channels. The UN Civil Assistance Command could not supply grain in the prescribed ratio of one-half rice and one-half other grains without sufficient advance time to fill the order. Instead, a one-third rice, one-third barley, and one-third wheat ration was apportioned to the prisoners in April and this caused an avalanche of complaints.

The 17 compounds occupied by the Communist prisoners at the end of April included 10 that had been screened and seven that had resisted all efforts to interview them. There was little doubt in Van Fleet's mind that force would have to be used and casualties expected if the recalcitrant compounds were to be screened. As he prepared plans to use force, Van Fleet warned Ridgway on 28 April that the prisoners already screened would probably demonstrate violently when UN forces moved into the compounds still holding out. In anticipation of trouble Van Fleet moved the 3rd Battalion, 9th Infantry Regiment to Geoje to reinforce the 38th Infantry Regiment and ordered the 1st Battalion, 15th Infantry Regiment and the ROK 20th Regiment to Pusan. Barring accident, he intended to begin screening shortly after 1 May.

Confronted with almost certain violence, Ridgway decided to ask for permission to cancel forced screening:

These compounds are well organized and effective control cannot be exercised within them without use of such great degree of force as might verge on the brutal and result in killing and wounding quite a number of inmates. While I can exercise such forced screening, I believe that the risk of violence and violence involved, both to U.N.C. personnel and to the inmates themselves, would not warrant this course of action. Further, the unfavorable publicity which would probably result... would provide immediate and effective Communist material...

This request and Ridgway's plan to list the prisoners in the unscreened compounds as desiring repatriation were approved. Although failure to interview all the inmates in these enclosures might well prevent some prisoners from choosing non-repatriation, Ridgway's superiors held that if the prisoners felt strongly enough about not returning to Communist control, they would somehow make their wishes known.

In early May, after a tour of inspection, Colonel Robert T. Chaplin, Provost marshal of the Far East Command, reported that Communist prisoners refused even to bring in their own food and supplies. The possibility of new incidents that might embarrass the UN Command, especially at Panmunjom, led Ridgway to remind Van Fleet that proper control had to be maintained regardless of whether screening was conducted or not. As it happened, Van Fleet was more concerned over the fact that Chaplin had not informed Eighth Army of his impressions first than he was over the prisoner-camp situation. There was no cause for "undue anxiety" about Geoje, he told Ridgway on 5 May. Actually, Eighth Army officers admitted freely that UN authorities could not enter the compounds, inspect sanitation, supervise medical support, or work the Communists prisoners as they desired. They exercised an external control only, in that UN security forces did prevent the prisoners from escaping. Thus, on 7 May the Communist prisoners and the UN appeared to have reached a stalemate. The former had interior control, but could not get out without violence; and the latter had exterior control, but could not get in without violence. With the cancellation of forced screening, the UN Command indicated that it was willing to accept the status quo rather than initiate another wave of bloodshed in the camps. The next move was up to the Communists.

=== Capture of General Dodd (7–10 May 1952) ===
It did not take long for the Communist prisoners to act. As investigation later revealed, they had become familiar with the habits of General Francis Dodd, the camp commandant, during the spring and by the beginning of May they had readied a plan. Well aware that Dodd was anxious to lessen the tension in the camp, they also knew that he often went unarmed to the sally ports of the compounds and talked to the leaders. This system of personal contact kept Dodd in close touch with camp problems, but it exposed him to an element of risk. Only the guards carried weapons on Geoje and there were no locks on the compounds gates, since work details were constantly passing in and out. Security personnel were not authorized to shoot save in case of grave emergency or in self-defense, and were not permitted to keep a round in the chamber of their guns. In the past the Communists had successfully kidnapped several UN soldiers and although they had later released them unharmed after Communist complaints had been heard, the practice was neither new nor unknown. Since the technique had proved profitable in previous instances, the prisoners decided to capture the camp commandant. Taking advantage of his willingness to come to them, they made careful plans.

On the evening of 6 May, members of a Communist work detail from Compound 76 refused to enter the enclosure until they had spoken to Lieutenant Colonel Wilbur R. Raven, commanding officer of the 94th Military Police Battalion and the compound. The prisoners told Raven that guards had beaten members of the compound and searched them for contraband. When he promised to investigate the charges, they seemed satisfied, but asked to see Dodd the next day to discuss matters of importance. Raven was noncommittal since he did not wish the prisoners to imagine that they could summon the commandant at will, but he promised to pass the message on to the general. The prisoners indicated that they would be willing to let themselves be listed and fingerprinted if Dodd would come and talk to them. Dodd had just been instructed to complete an accurate roster and identification of all the remaining prisoners of war on Geoje and hoped for the chance to win a bloodless victory. Raven finished his discussions with the leaders of Compound 76 shortly after 14:00 on 7 May and Dodd drove up a few minutes later. As usual they talked with the unlocked gate of the sally port between them and the Communists gave a series of questions concerning items of food and clothing they required. Then, branching into politics, they inquired about the truce negotiations. First, they attempted to invite Dodd and Raven to come inside and sit down so that they could carry on the discussion in a more comfortable atmosphere. Raven turned down these suggestions bluntly since he himself had previously been seized and held. More prisoners had meanwhile gathered in the sally port and Dodd permitted them to approach and listen to the conversation. In the midst of the talk, a work detail turning in tents for salvage came through the sally port and the outer door was opened to let them pass out. It remained ajar and the prisoners drew closer to Dodd and Raven as if to finish their discussion. Suddenly they leapt forward and began to drag the two officers into the compound. Raven grabbed hold of a post until the guards rushed up and used their bayonets to force the prisoners back, but Dodd was successfully hauled inside the compound, whisked behind a row of blankets draped along the inner barbed wire fence, and hurried to a tent that was prepared for him. The prisoners told him that the kidnapping had been planned and that the other compounds would have made an attempt to seize him if the opportunity had arisen.

The Communists treated Dodd well. The prisoners did all they could to provide him with small comforts and permitted medicine for his ulcers to be brought in. They applied no physical pressure whatsoever, yet they left no doubt that Dodd would be the first casualty and that they would resist violently any attempt to rescue him by force. Under the circumstances they hoped for Dodd to co-operate and help them reach a bloodless settlement and Dodd complied. He agreed to act as go-between for the prisoners and relayed their demands to the outside. A telephone was installed and upon Dodd's recommendation, representatives from all of the other compounds were brought to Compound 76 for a meeting to work out the demands that would be submitted to the UN Command. Colonel Craig attempted to use one of the senior KPA officers, Colonel Lee Hak Koo, to persuade inmates of Compound 76 to release Dodd, but Lee, as soon as he had entered the compound, remained and became the prisoners' representative.

With the successful completion of the first step, the Communists began carrying out the second phase. Within a few minutes of Dodd's capture, they hoisted a large sign announcing: "We capture Dodd. As long as our demand will be solved, his safety is secured. If there happen brutal act such as shooting, his life is danger." The threat was soon followed by the first note from Dodd that he was all right and asking that no troops be sent in to release him until after 17:00. Apparently Dodd felt that he could persuade the prisoners to let him go by that time. In the meantime word had passed swiftly back to Yount and through him to Van Fleet, of the capture of Dodd. Van Fleet immediately instructed Yount not to use force to effect Dodd's release unless Eighth Army approved such action. Yount in turn sent his chief of staff, Colonel William H. Craig, by air to Geoje to assume command. Repeating Van Fleet's injunction not to use force, Yount told Craig: "We are to talk them out. Obviously if somebody makes mass break we most certainly will resist... But unless they attempt such a thing, under no circumstances use fire to get them out. Wait them out. One thing above all, approach it calmly. If we get them excited only God knows what will happen." The fear of a concerted attempt to break out of the compounds and the resultant casualties that both the UN and prisoners would probably suffer dominated this conversation and mirrored the first reaction of Dodd's superiors to the potential explosiveness of the situation. A major uprising would mean violence and unfavorable publicity that would be useful to China and North Korea. Dodd's actions in Compound 76 complemented this desire to localize the incident.

As the Communist representatives met on the night of 7 May, Dodd urged that no troops be employed to get him since he did not think he would be harmed. Dodd's plea coincided with the wishes of Yount and Van Fleet at this point. Craig agreed to remain passive. On the next day, the prisoners presented Dodd with a list of their demands. The chief preoccupation of the prisoners during this early phase concerned the formation and recognition by the UN of prisoner organization with telephone facilities between the compounds and two vehicles for intra-compound travel. Despite not having command authority to make any agreements, Dodd falsely promised to deliver most of the items of equipment that the prisoners asked for. After the meeting concluded, the representatives wanted to return to their compounds and report to the rest of the prisoners; thus another delay ensued. Yount refused to allow them to leave until Van Fleet overruled him late in the afternoon. By the time the representatives discussed events with their compound mates and returned to Compound 76, evening had begun. While the prisoners were carrying on their conversations, Craig sent for trained machine gun crews, grenades, and gas masks. The 3rd Battalion, 9th Infantry Regiment boarded LST at Busan and set out for Geoje. Republic of Korea Navy picket boats ringed the island in case of a major escape attempt and Navy, Marine and Air Force planes remained on alert. Company B of the 64th Medium Tank Battalion was detached from the US 3rd Infantry Division and started to move toward Pusan.

From the US I Corps, Van Fleet sent Brigadier general Charles F. Colson, chief of staff, to take charge of the camp and remove Dodd by force. Colson had no knowledge of conditions on Geoje until he was chosen and only a sketchy acquaintance with the issues being discussed at Panmunjom. First official written demands were to be delivered to Compound 76 asking that Dodd be freed immediately. At the same time the prisoners would be informed that Dodd no longer was in command and could make no decisions. If they refused to surrender, Yount would set a time limit and try to intimidate the Communists, claiming that they would be "held responsible" for Dodd's safety when violence was used against them. As soon as the deadline expired, Yount would attempt to enter the compound by force, release Dodd, and take control. Yount passed Van Fleet's orders on to Colson late on 8 May.

Early on the morning of 9 May Colson sent in his first official demand for Dodd's safe deliverance and six hours later he issued a second order. When Lee Hak Koo finally responded, he countered with the statement that Dodd had already admitted that he had practiced "inhuman massacre and murderous barbarity" against the prisoners. Recognizing Colson as the new camp commander, Lee asked him to join Dodd at the compound meeting. The refusal of the prisoners to meet Colson's order was a risky move, as it could have led to the presentation of an ultimatum with a time limit, but Colson was still waiting for more tanks to arrive from the mainland. Since the tanks would not arrive until late on the 9th, violent measures to subjugate the prisoners were postponed. Both Yount and Major general Orlando Mood, chief of staff of the Eighth Army, agreed to this postponement. In the meantime Colson intended to sabotage the prisoners; his first move in this direction was to stop the POW representatives from circulating back and forth between their compounds and Compound 76. Suspicious of Colson's provocative move and the apparent preparations for a violent offensive around the compound, the Communists instructed Dodd to ask Colson whether they could hold their meeting without fear of interruption. They again made clear that Dodd would be freed after the meeting if all went well. Since the UN Command was unable to move until 10 May anyway, the prisoners were told that they could meet in safety.

As the prisoners convened on the 9th, the capture of Dodd assumed a new dimension. They informed the hostage that they were going to discuss allegations of brutalities committed against their members, repatriation and screening, as well as the prisoner organization. A people's court set up by the prisoners drew up a list of nineteen counts of death and/or injury to compound inmates and had Dodd answer to each charge. Although they were generally disposed to accept his explanations and dismiss the accusations, the prisoner's trial of the commanding officer of the POW camp on criminal counts, making him defend his record, while still surrounded by heavily armed enemy troops, was without parallel in modern military history.

As the trial proceeded, Colson had the 38th Infantry Regiment reinforce the guards on all the compounds and had automatic weapons set up in pairs at strategic locations. He directed Lieutenant colonel William J. Kernan, commanding officer of the 38th, to prepare a plan for violent entry into Compound 76, using tanks, flamethrowers, armored cars, .50-caliber multiple mounts, tear gas, riot guns, and the like, with a target date of 10:00 on 10 May. In the early afternoon, Van Fleet flew into Geoje for a conference. He had discussed the situation with Ridgway and his appointed successor, General Mark W. Clark, who had just arrived in the Far East, and they all agreed that no press or photo coverage would be permitted. They wanted Colson to be sure to give every opportunity to non-belligerent prisoners to surrender peaceably while he engaged in battle for control of the compound. Van Fleet added that he did not think that US troops should go into the compound, until firepower from the outside had forced submission and driven the prisoners into small adjacent compounds that had been constructed in the meantime. If necessary he was willing to grant the prisoners' request for an association with equipment and communication facilities, but he reminded Colson that he had full authority to use all the force required to release Dodd and secure proper control and discipline. Regardless of the outcome of this affair, Van Fleet wanted dispersion of the compounds carried out. He left the timing of the Compound 76 operation in Colson's hands, but the negotiating period should end at 10:00 on 10 May.

Dodd's trial dragged on through the afternoon as the translation process was slow and laborious. By dusk it was evident that the proceedings would not finish that night and Dodd phoned Colson asking for an extension until noon the next day. He was convinced that the Communists would keep their promise to let him go as soon as the meeting finished. But Eighth Army refused to alter the 10:00 deadline. The Communists clarified that they had intended to conduct meetings for ten days, but in the light of the UN stand they would attempt to complete their work in the morning. During the night of 9–10 May, 20 tanks, five equipped with flamethrowers, arrived on Geoje and were brought into position. Extra wire was laid and the 16 small compounds were ready to receive the prisoners of Compound 76. All of the guns were in place and gas masks were issued.

As daylight broke, the prisoners presented their latest demands. They directed their attack against UN prisoner policy, repatriation, and screening. Although the English translation is awkward and some of the phrases difficult to understand, their demands were as follows:

1. Immediate ceasing the barbarous behavior, insults, torture, forcible protest with blood writing, threatening, confinement, mass murdering, gun and machine gun shooting, using poison gas, germ weapons, experiment object of A-Bomb, by your command. You should guarantee PW's human rights and individual life with the base on the International Law.
2. Immediate stopping the so-called illegal and unreasonable volunteer repatriation of NKPA and CPVA PW's.
3. Immediate ceasing the forcible investigation (Screening) which thousands of PW's of NKPA and CPVA be rearmed and failed in slavery, permanently and illegally.
4. Immediate recognition of the P.W. Representative Group (Commission) consisted of NKPA and CPVA PW's and close cooperation to it by your command.

This Representative Group will turn in Brig. Gen. Dodd, USA, on your hand after we receive the satisfactory declaration to resolve the above items by your command. We will wait for your warm and sincere answer.

The Communists' goal was to discredit the screening process and repatriation policy backed so stubbornly by the UN delegation at Panmunjom.

A disturbing report from Colson's intelligence officer indicated that the other compounds were ready to stage a mass breakout as soon as he launched his attack and, as if to substantiate this item, the villages near the compound were deserted. Colson was willing to recognize the POW association, but had no jurisdiction over the problem of repatriation. If Yount could get authority to renounce nominal screening, Colson thought he could come to an agreement with the prisoners. Mood felt that nominal screening could be dropped and gave his approval to Yount to go ahead. The Communists wanted Colson's answer in writing, but the translator available to Colson was not particularly quick or accurate. Colson did not initiate violence and answered as follows:

1. With reference to your item 1 of that message, I am forced to tell you that we are not and have not committed any of the offenses which you allege. I can assure you that we will continue in that policy and the prisoners of war can expect humane treatment in this camp.
2. Reference your item two regarding voluntary repatriation of NKPA and CPVA PW, that is a matter which is being discussed at Panmunjom, and over which I have no control or influence.
3. Regarding your item three pertaining to forcible investigation (screening), I can inform you that after General Dodd's release, unharmed, there will be no more forcible screening of PW's in this camp, nor will any attempt be made at nominal screening.
4. Reference your item four, we have no objection to the organization of a PW representative group or commission consisting of NKPA and CPVA PW, and are willing to work out the details of such an organization as soon as practicable after General Dodd's release.

Colson added an ultimatum that Dodd must be freed by noon and no later. With the exception of the word "more" in Item 3, Colson's reply was noncommittal and the Communists refused to accept it or release Dodd.

As the antagonists on Geoje wrangled over the details, Ridgway and Van Fleet encountered increasing difficulty in finding out what was going on. When news of the four demands seeped back to UN headquarters, Ridgway had attempted to forestall Colson's reply, but had been too late. He realized the propaganda value of an admission of the prisoners' charges, but Van Fleet had assured him that Colson's answer carried no implied acknowledgment of illegal or reprehensible acts. As the afternoon drew to a close and no report of Colson's negotiations arrived in Tokyo, Ridgway became impatient. Pointing out that incalculable damage might be done to the UN cause if Colson accepted the prisoners' demands, he complained of the lack of information from Geoje. "I have still been unable to get an accurate prompt record of action taken by your camp commander in response to these latest Communist demands. I am seriously handicapped thereby in the issuance of further instructions."

When the noon deadline passed without incident, Dodd phoned Colson and presented the prisoners' case. He explained that there had been incidents in the past when prisoners had been killed and Colson's answer simply denied everything. The Communists demanded an unequivocal admission of guilt. The prisoner leaders sat beside Dodd and had him pass on their suggestions for preparing Colson's reply in an acceptable form and then offered to write in the changes that the prisoners considered mandatory. Colson agreed. After a second version was still unacceptable to the Communists, Colson had to attempt to meet their demands as clearly as possible:

1. With reference to your item 1 of that message, I do admit that there has been instances of bloodshed where many PW have been killed and wounded by UN Forces. I can assure in the future that PW can expect humane treatment in this camp according to the principles of International Law. I will do all within my power to eliminate further violence and bloodshed. If such incidents happen in the future, I will be responsible.
2. Reference your item 2 regarding voluntary repatriation of Korean People's Army and Chinese People's Volunteer Army PW, that is a matter which is being discussed at Panmunjom. I have no control or influence over the decisions at the peace conference.
3. Regarding your item 3 pertaining to forcible investigation (screening), I can inform you that after General Dodd's release, unharmed, there will be no more forcible screening or any rearming of PW in this camp, nor will any attempt be made at nominal screening.
4. Reference your item 4, we approve the organization of a PW representative group or commission consisting of Korean People's Army and Chinese People's Volunteer Army, PW, according to the details agreed to by Gen Dodd and approved by me.

The release hour was advanced to 20:00 since so much time had been consumed in translating and discussing the changes. At 21:30 Dodd walked out of Compound 76 and was immediately taken to a place where he could be kept incommunicado.

The seizure of Dodd in itself was no meaningful victory, it was only when the Communists skilfully used Dodd as a pawn and then backed his capture with the threat of a mass breakout that they were able to win their demands so successfully. Despite the fact that there were over 11,000 armed troops supported by tanks and other weapons and despite the instructions from Ridgway and Van Fleet to employ force if Dodd was not freed, the Communists were victorious. What had begun as a military problem to be solved by military means became a political problem settled on the prisoners' terms. The Communists had seized the initiative and never relinquished it. They successfully blocked the use of force and won a formidable propagandistic victory.

Phrases like "I can assure in the future that PW can expect humane treatment" conceded that the prisoners had not received humane treatment in the past. In general, the response to the affair and the letter was unfavorable and at Panmunjom, the North Korean and Chinese delegates made full use of the propaganda value of the episode to embarrass the UN representatives. At 2nd Logistical Command headquarters, Yount established a board to investigate the matter and it found Dodd and Colson "blameless". This did not satisfy Van Fleet, who felt that Dodd had not conducted himself properly nor had his advice to Colson been fitting under the circumstances. He recommended administrative action against Dodd and an administrative reprimand for Colson. Clark was even more severe; he proposed reduction in grade to colonel for both Dodd and Colson and an administrative reprimand to Yount for failing to catch several damaging phrases in Colson's statement. The Department of the Army approved Clark's action. The quick and summary punishment of the key officers involved did not solve the problem of what to do about Colson's statement or the more basic question of how to clean up the long-standing conditions in the POW camps. Although the Washington leaders did not want to "repudiate" the letter, they told Clark to deny its validity on the grounds that it was obtained under duress and Colson had not had the authority to accept the false charges contained in the Communist demands. The first count was no doubt true but the second was certainly moot. Denial was not enough for the press, and on 27 May Chief of Staff of the United States Army General J. Lawton Collins gave Clark permission to issue a concise and factual release. The Chief of Staff felt that the UN Command had always abided by the Geneva Convention and allowed the ICRC regular access to the camps. Clark's account, he went on, should stress this and emphasize that the incidents stemmed from the actions of the fanatical, die-hard Communists. In closing, the Far East commander should outline the corrective measures being taken.

In the wake of the Dodd incident came a series of actions. The stiffening attitude of the UN revealed itself first at Prisoner of War Enclosure Number 10 at Pusan for hospital cases. Among the patients and attached work details, 3,500 in Compounds 1, 2 and 3 had not been screened and segregated. Hoping to forestall concerted action, the camp commander, Lieutenant colonel John Bostic, informed the prisoners on 11 May that food and water would be available only at the new quarters prepared for them. He planned to screen and segregate the non-patients first as they moved to the new compounds and then take care of the sick. Although he had two battalions of infantry in positions around the three compounds, only Compound 3 made any attempt to negotiate conditions under which they would be screened and moved. Bostic refused to treat with the leaders of Compound 3; the other compounds simply remained indifferent to his order. After a deceptively quiet night, the prisoners became restive. Signs were painted, flags waved, demonstrations mounted, and patriotic songs sung as feelings ran high. Infantrymen of the 15th Regiment surrounded the compounds with fixed bayonets and a couple of tanks were wheeled into positions, but no attempt was made to start the screening. Despite complaints from the prisoners, they made no effort to comply with Bostic's instructions. Compound 3 set up sandbags during the night of 12 May but no further violence occurred. On the next day, loudspeakers started to hammer home the UN orders over and over again, yet the prisoners laughed at offers of hot food and cigarettes available to them in the new compounds. A few stray shots were fired on the 14th and the prisoners hurled rocks at the guards, but the deadlock continued. To break the impasse, Van Fleet permitted several ICRC representatives to interview the prisoners. Compound 1 requested the first conference with the Red Cross men and then the other compounds followed suit. The prisoners became quieter after the ICRC talks, but they were not ready to obey Bostic's orders. On 15 May Yount won Van Fleet's approval to put the emphasis on control rather than screening, with the prisoners not screened to remain unrostered until a settlement was reached at Panmunjom. Armed with this authority and with ICRC help, Bostic reached an agreement with the leaders of Compound 1 on 17 May. There was no screening and the prisoners moved without incident to their new compound. Hope that the other two compounds would follow the example of Compound 1 proved forlorn.

=== Breaking up the camp (19 May – June 1952) ===
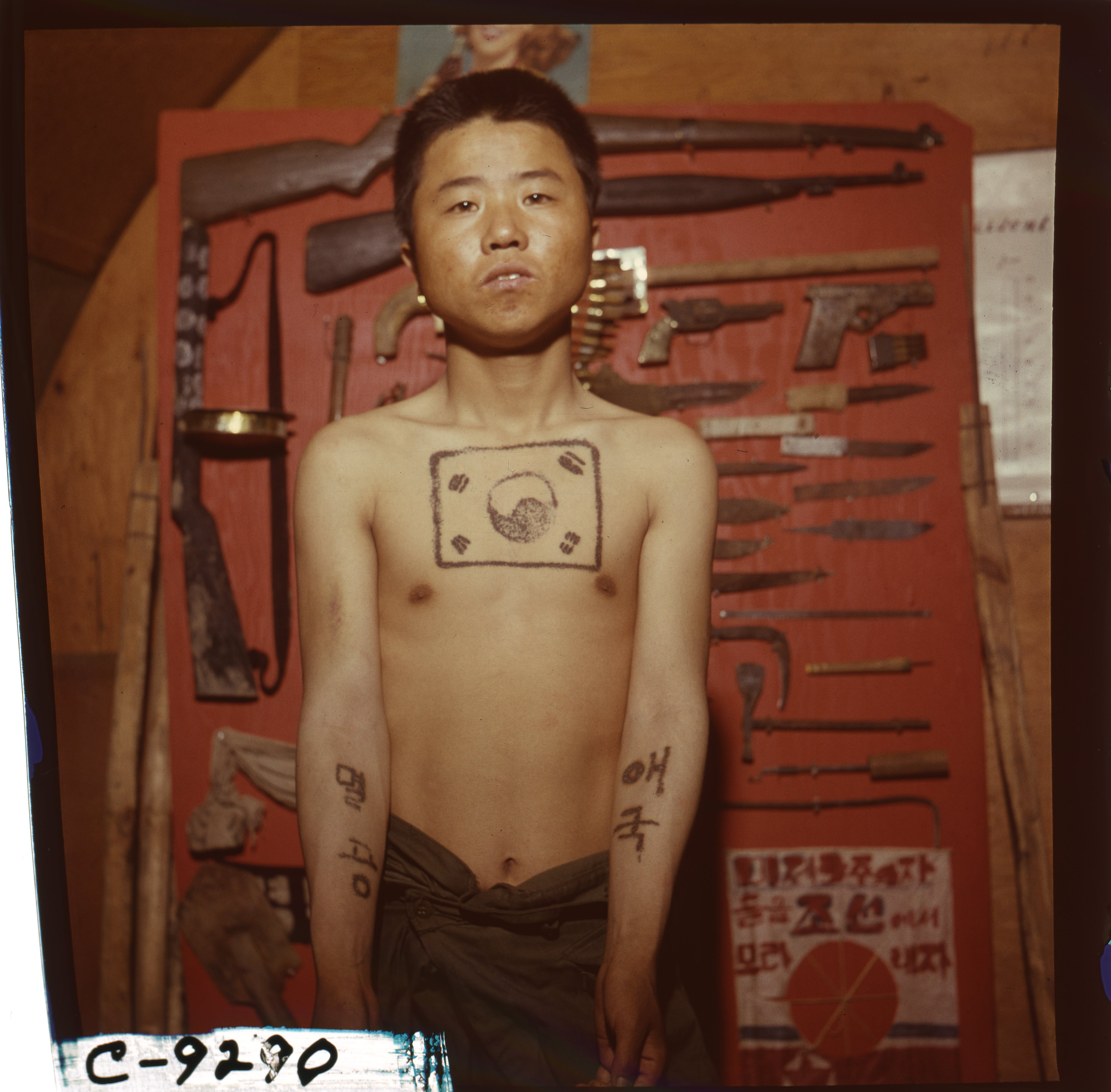
Communist POW spy tattooed by anti-communist POWs, July 1952

On 19 May, Van Fleet approved the use of force to clear the recalcitrant compounds. After a brief announcement the following morning warning the prisoners that this was their last chance to obey, infantry teams entered Compound 3 and advanced against mounting resistance. Armed with stones, flails, sharpened tent poles, steel pipes, and knives, the defiant prisoners screamed insults and challenges. The infantry maintained discipline, using tear gas and concussion grenades to break up the prisoners' opposition. Herding the prisoners into a corner, the UN troops forced them into their new compound. Only one prisoner was killed and 20 were wounded as against one US injury. The example of Compound 3 evidently was borne home to Compound 2, for on 21 May they put up no resistance as the infantrymen moved them into new quarters without casualties to either side. Whether the prisoners were screened or not became secondary after the Dodd incident. Van Fleet was most anxious to regain control over all the compounds and he had his staff examine the situation carefully in mid-May. They submitted three alternatives on 16 May: 1. Remove all prisoners from Korea; 2. Disperse the prisoners within Korea; and 3. Combine 1 and 2 by removing some prisoners and dispersing the rest. If all of the POW's were transferred out of the country, the Eighth Army commander would be free to concentrate on his primary mission and be relieved of a rear area security problem. Under the third alternative, at least some of the prisoners would be shifted and the Eighth Army responsibility lessened. Van Fleet preferred the first, but found the third more desirable than the retention of all of the prisoners in Korea. Dispersal within Korea would ensure better control, to be sure, but it would entail more logistic support and more administrative and security personnel. But Clark did not accept the movement of any of the prisoners out of Korea and he instructed Van Fleet to go ahead with his dispersal plan as quickly as possible. He was willing to send the 187th Airborne Regimental Combat Team to Van Fleet to aid in the operation. Additional tank support would have to be supplied by Eighth Army if it were required.

Besides the reinforcement of the Geoje forces, Van Fleet intended to construct barricades and roadblocks at strategic points until he was prepared to deconcentrate the prisoners. The new enclosures would be located on Geoje, Jeju Island and on the mainland and he estimated that 22 enclosures, each holding 4,000 prisoners and at least 0.5 miles (0.80 km) apart, would be sufficient. Compounds would be limited to 500 men apiece with double fencing and concertina wire between compounds. When the new camps were finished, Van Fleet was going to try to use the prisoners' representatives to induce them to move voluntarily, but if resistance developed, as he expected it would, food and water would be withheld and the prisoners would receive these only at the new compounds. As a last resort, he would employ force. Both Clark and his superiors agreed that although the plan might incur unfavorable publicity and had to be handled carefully, the Communist control on Geoje had to be broken. Van Fleet accepted the recommendations that ICRC assistance be utilized as much as possible and that other UN contingents be added to the forces on Geoje. He had the Netherlands Battalion already on the island and he would send a UK company, a Canadian Company and a Greek company to provide a UN flavor. As for the press, normal coverage facilities would be provided.

To supervise the difficult task of moving the prisoners, Van Fleet appointed Brigadier general Haydon L. Boatner, assistant division commander of the US 2nd Infantry Division, as the new commander of Geoje. Using infantrymen as well as engineers, Boatner pushed the construction of the smaller, stronger enclosures by working his troops in two 12-hour shifts. He also moved over 6,000 civilians away from the camp and off the island. By early June Boatner was prepared to test his plan for securing control of the Communist compounds. Despite repeated orders to remove the Communist flags that were being boldly flown in Compounds 85, 96 and 60, the prisoners ignored Boatner's commands. On 4 June, infantrymen from the 38th Regiment supported by two tanks moved quickly into Compound 85. While the tanks smashed down the flagpoles, the troops tore down signs, burnt the Communist banners, and rescued 10 bound prisoners. Half an hour later they repeated their success at Compound 96 and brought out 75 anti-Communist prisoners. The only enemy flags still aloft were in Compound 60 and the infantry did not need the tanks for this job. Using tear gas, they went in and chopped down the poles. Not a single casualty was suffered by either side during these quick strikes. Although the prisoners restored the flagpoles the following day, the experience gained in the exercise seemed helpful. Satisfied by this test run, Boatner decided to tackle the big task next.

On the morning of 10 June, he ordered Lee Hak Koo to assemble the prisoners of Compound 76 in groups of 150 in the center of the compound and to be prepared to move them out. Instead, the prisoners brought forth their knives, spears, and tent poles and took their positions in trenches, ready to resist. Paratroopers of the 187th Airborne Regimental Combat Team wasted little time as they advanced without firing a shot. Employing concussion grenades, tear gas, bayonets and fists, they drove or dragged the prisoners out of the trenches. As a half-dozen M46 Patton tanks rolled in and trained their guns on the last 300 prisoners still fighting, resistance collapsed. Lee was captured and dragged by the seat of his pants out of the compound. The other prisoners were hustled into trucks, transported to the new compounds, fingerprinted, and given new clothing. During the 2.5 hour battle, 31 prisoners were killed, many by the Communists themselves, and 139 were wounded. One US soldier was speared to death and 14 were injured. After Compound 76 had been cleared, a tally of weapons showed 3,000 spears, 4,500 knives, 1,000 gasoline grenades, plus an undetermined number of clubs, hatchets, barbed wire flails and hammers. These weapons had been fashioned out of scrap materials and metal-tipped tent poles by the prisoners. The aftermath proved how quickly the lesson was learned. After leaders of Compounds 78 and 77 had witnessed the fight, they swiftly agreed to move wherever Boatner wanted them to. In Compound 77 the bodies of 16 murdered men were found. The show of force was effective in eliminating the core of Communist defiance and paved the way for the relatively uneventful transfer of the other compounds on Geoje to their new stockades during the rest of June. With the dispersal plan successfully completed, Clark decided to remove the POW problem from Eighth Army jurisdiction.

Beginning in July 1952, the first 27,000 "civilians," in 16 groups, were extradited to South Korean control. In American documents, those willing to return to North Korea were referred to as "diehard communists". In October 1952 around 38,000 inmates were reclassified as civilians, 7,000 of whom insisted on their return home. However, they were all handed over to the South Koreans. This happened mainly because Boatner wanted clear the camp of non-soldiers. Koreans born in the south who wanted to be repatriated to the north were transferred to the camp on Chubong Island. (Note: Bongam Island (봉암도; 蜂岩島) and Chuam Island (추암도; 秋岩島) are former names of what is now called Chubong Island (추봉도; 秋蜂島).)

On 10 July the Korean Communications Zone was established under the Far East Command and took over responsibility for rear area activities from the Eighth Army. One of the lessons that had to be relearned during the Geoje affair was that an army commander should not be burdened with the administration of his communications zone, since the distraction could not fail to detract from his efficiency in carrying out his primary mission—to fight the enemy.

There were other lessons that were taken on board by the US forces during this period. In most cases, after a prisoner was captured, he might attempt to escape and this was about as far as he would go. With the Communists, a new element of experience was added. The Communist prisoner's service did not end with his capture, but frequently became more important. In the POW camp his responsibilities shifted from the military to politico-military duties. Easy to organize and well-disciplined, the loyal Communist prisoners required strict control or they would exploit their position for propaganda purposes. Death or injury was readily accepted if the ends were worthwhile and soft treatment merely made them more insolent and disobedient. Only force and strength were respected, for these they recognized and understood. As for the administration of the Communist POW camps, the necessity for high-quality personnel at all levels was plain. Unless the leadership and security forces were well briefed politically and alert, the Communists would miss no opportunity to cause trouble. At Geoje the lack of information of what was going on inside the compounds pointed up another deficiency. Trained counterintelligence agents had to be planted inside to keep the camp commander advised on the plans and activities of the prisoners and to prevent surprises like the Dodd capture from happening.

In assessing the effects of the Geoje incidents, it is difficult to escape the conclusion that they seriously weakened the international support that the UN Command had been getting on its screening program and on voluntary repatriation. In Great Britain, questions were raised in Parliament implying that the screening in April had been improperly or ineffectively carried out. Japanese press opinion reflected a growing suspicion that the US authorities had lost control of the screening process and permitted South Korean Government pressure to be exerted directly or indirectly against repatriation. As General Jenkins, Army G-3, pointed out to Collins early in June: "The cumulative effect of sentiment such as that reflected above may tend to obscure the UNC principle of no forcible repatriation, and appear to make the armistice hinge on the questionable results of a discredited screening operation."

The presence of ICRC representatives during the clean-up activities at Pusan and Geoje did little to enhance the reputation of the UN prisoner of war policies. Although the ICRC could offer little constructive advice on how the UN could regain control and admitted that the prisoners were committing many illegal acts, they protested vigorously against the tactics of the UN. Violence, withholding food and water even if these were available elsewhere and the use of force on hospital patients were heavily scored and the reports that the ICRC submitted to Geneva were bound to evoke an unfavorable reaction in many quarters.91 Despite the fact that focus shifted from Geoje as the dispersal program brought the Communist prisoners under tighter controls, the cloud of doubt and suspicion that hovered over the Geoje episode could not help but make the task of the UN delegates at Panmunjom more complex.

== Closure and redevelopment ==
As part of the negotiations of the Korean Armistice Agreement, Operation Little Switch in April and May 1953 saw the repatriation of 6670 sick and injured Chinese and North Korean POWs. Once the Armistice Agreement was signed on 27 July 1953, Operation Big Switch and Little Switch saw the repatriation of roughly 83,000 prisoners to the North, and 22,000 to the South. However, 76 North Korean and 12 Chinese POWs declined either option, preferring to settle in India, Argentina and Brazil instead.

Geoje Camp was closed following the signing of the Armistice Agreement. A memorial park was established on part of the old camp in 1997 it incorporates recreation of prisoner barracks and life and a display of period and more modern military hardware.

== Gallery ==
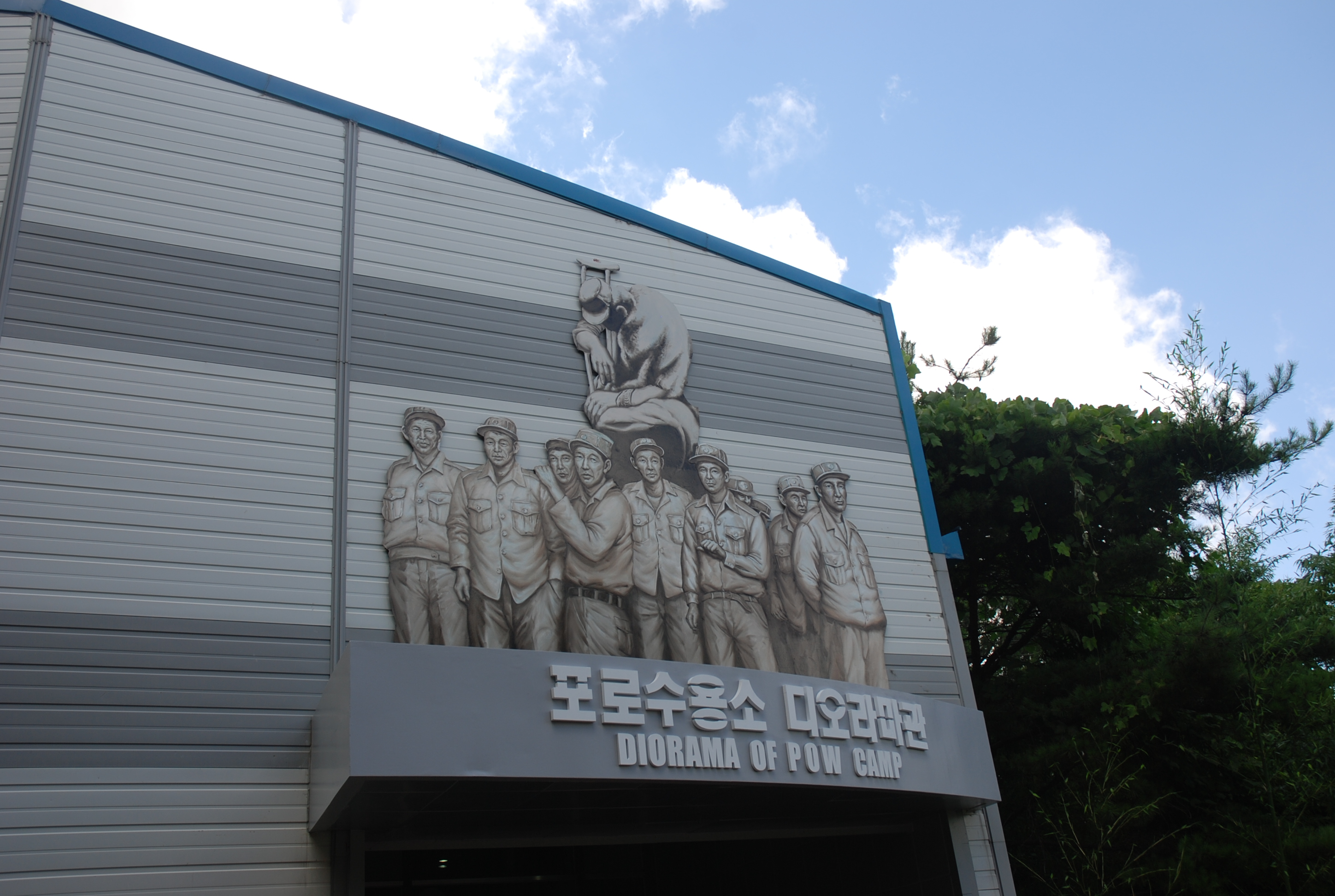
Diorama Exhibition

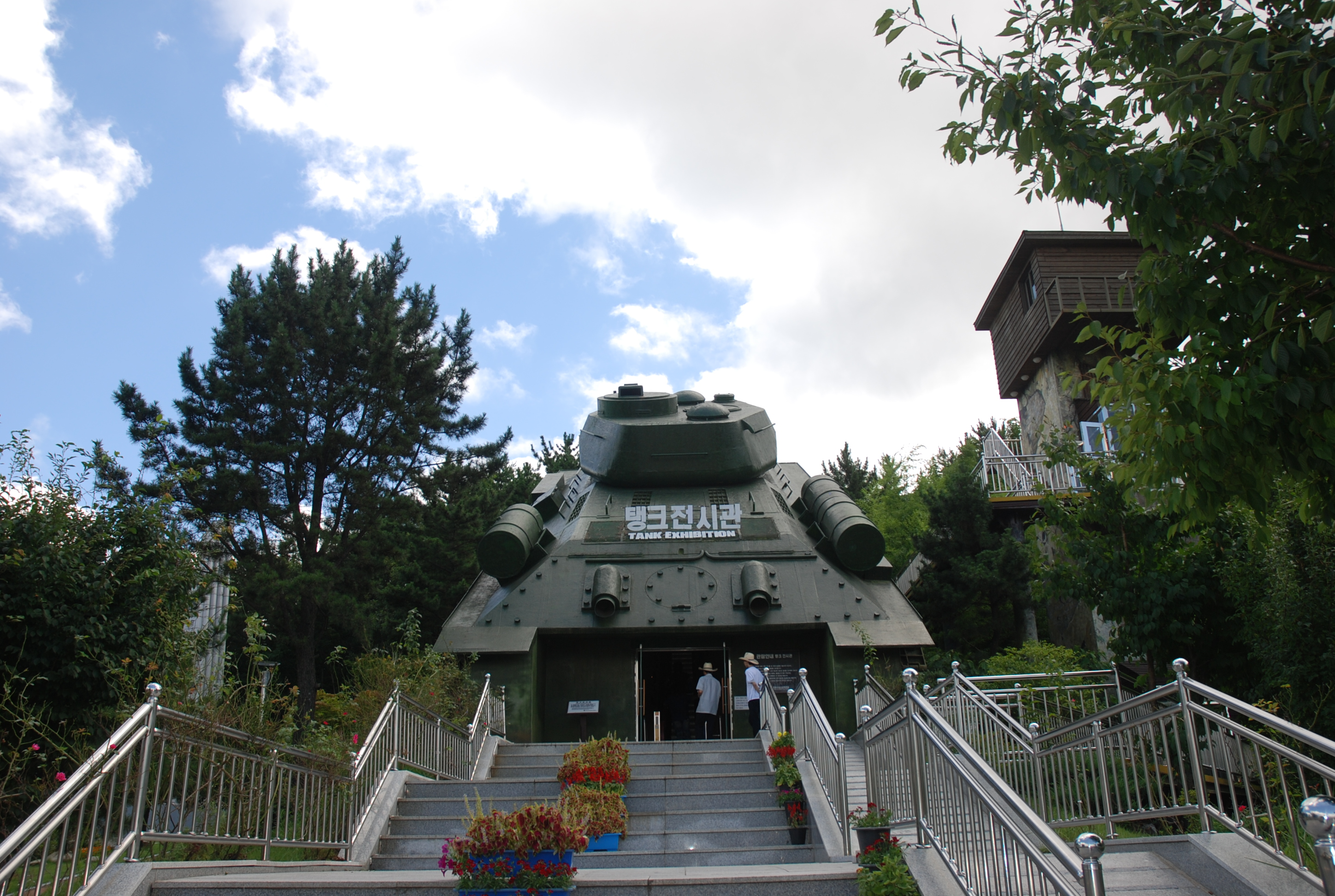
Tank Exhibition

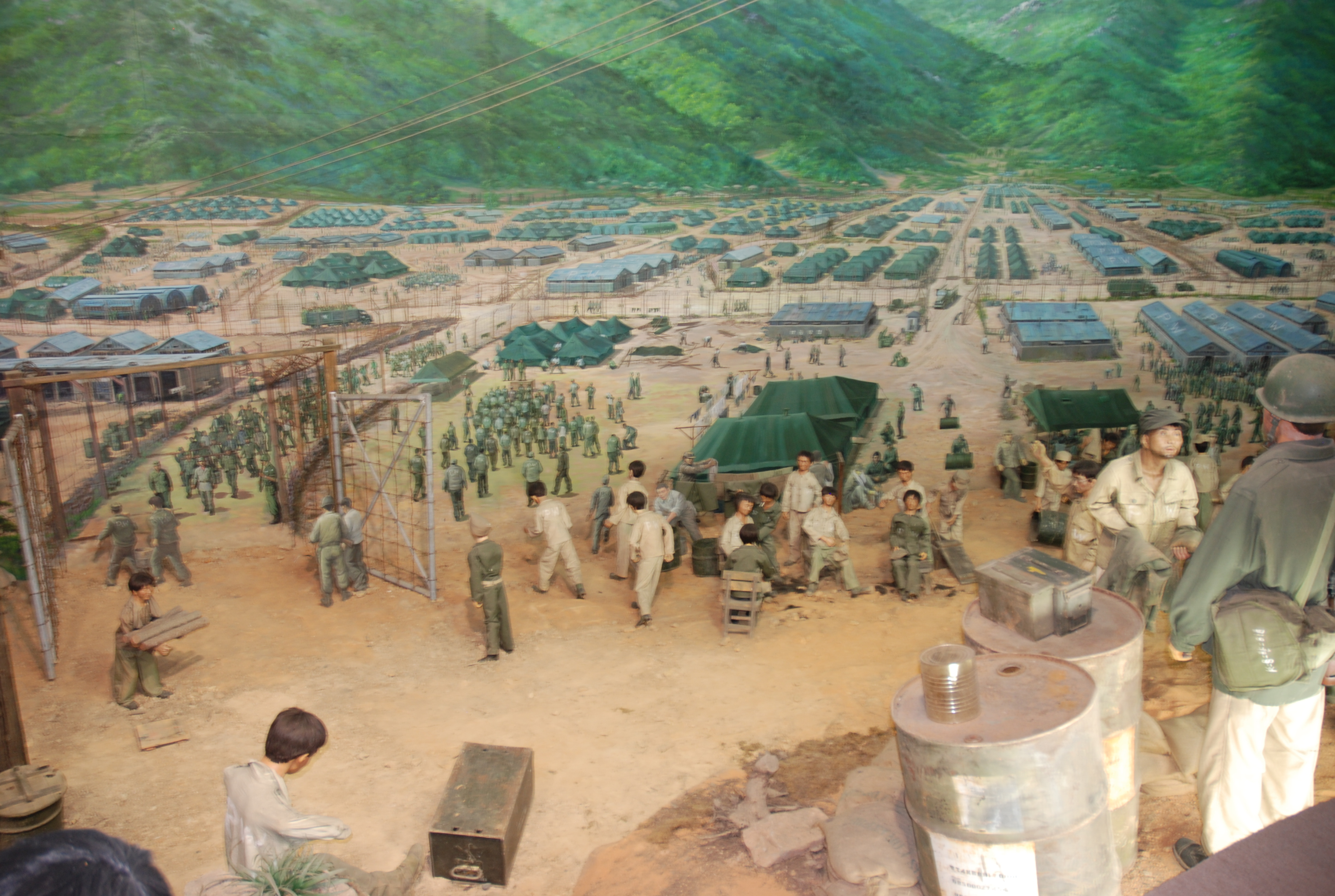
The POW camp miniature in Diorama Exhibition

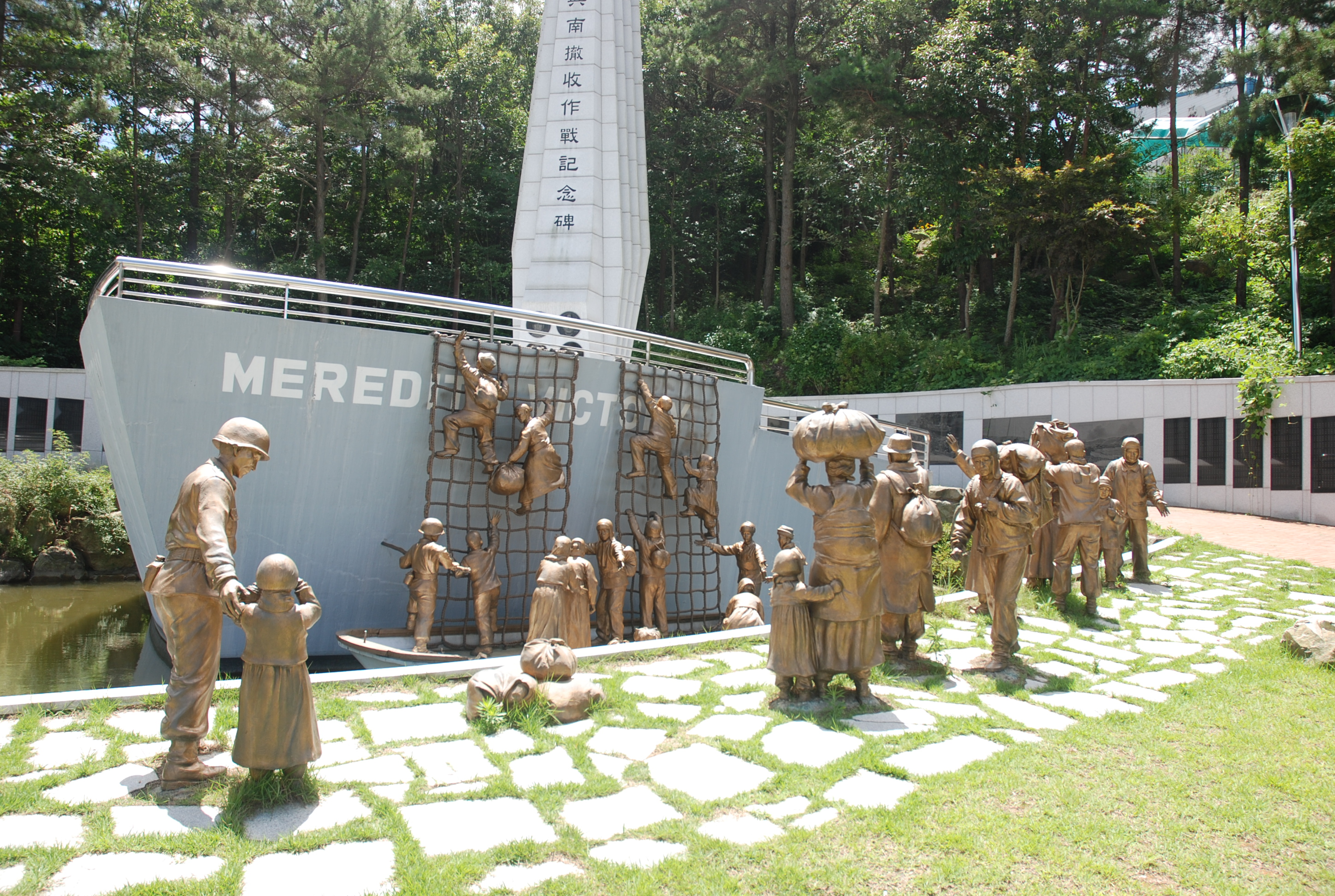
Hungnam Evacuation Memorial Tower

== In popular culture ==
The Geoje POW Camp was the main setting of the South Korean film Swing Kids (2018), a fictional story about a group of POWs who, under the leadership of a United States Officer stationed at the POW Camp, form a troupe of tap dancers.

The POW camp is mentioned in "Joint Security Area", Park Chan-wook's movie (2000).

The POW camp is a setting in the novel War Trash by Chinese author Ha Jin.

The POW camp became a slang for "brawl" or "unrest" in Hungarian as kocsedó (derived from Geoje-do).
