= Francis Dodd (general) =

United States Army general (1899–1973)

Francis T. Dodd
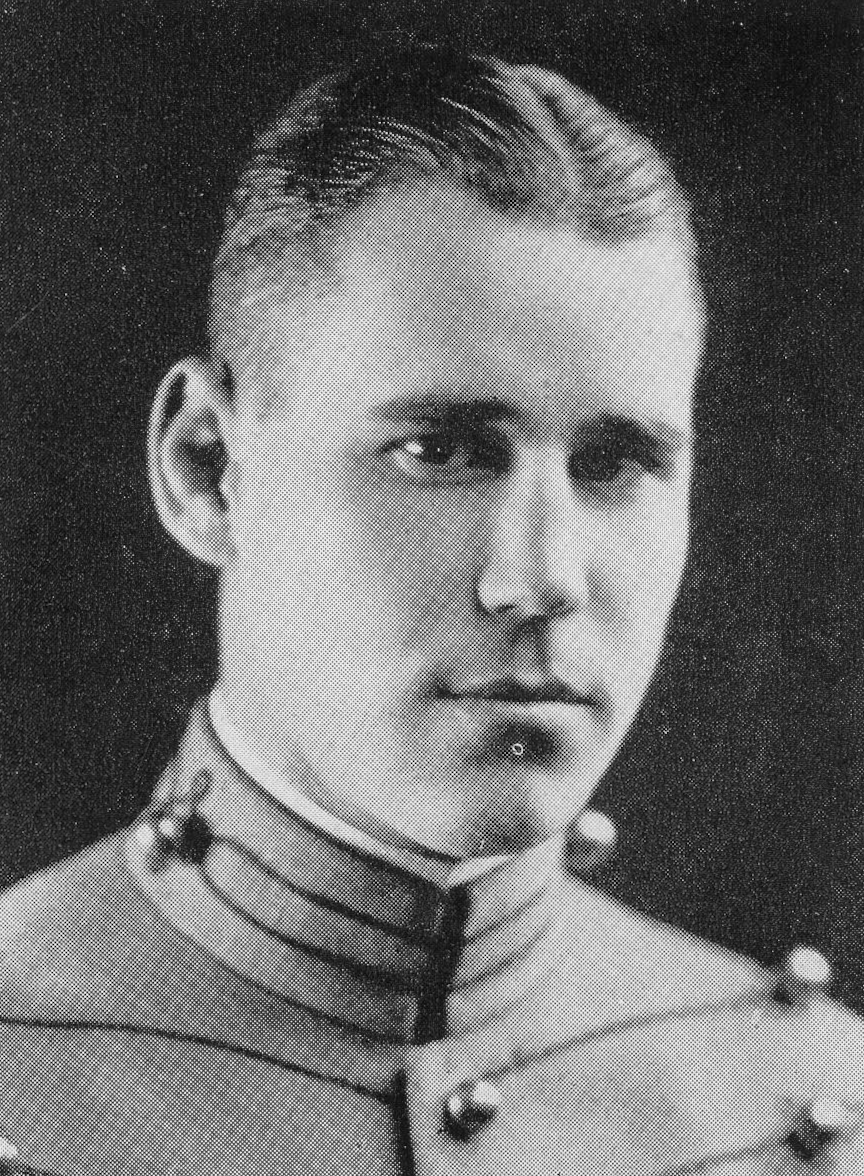
- At West Point in 1923
- Born: October 5, 1899; Angola, Indiana, United States
- Died: March 5, 1973 (aged 73); San Antonio, Texas, United States
- Burial place: Fort Sam Houston National Cemetery, Texas, United States
- Military career
- Allegiance: United States
- Branch: United States Army
- Service years: 1923–1953
- Rank: Brigadier general
- Conflicts: World War II; Korean War

Francis Townsend Dodd (October 5, 1899 – March 5, 1973) was a U.S. Army brigadier general held hostage by North Korean POWs during a camp uprising when he was commander of the United Nations-administered prisoner-of-war camps on Koje Island during the Korean War. The incident led to a North Korean propaganda victory after the Army was forced to make embarrassing admissions to secure Dodd's release. Dodd and others involved in the incident subsequently suffered career-ending damage to their reputations.

== Early life and West Point career ==
Dodd was born in Angola, Indiana, on October 5, 1899. He graduated from the United States Military Academy in West Point, where he was a four-year varsity letterman in both football and track; as a halfback on the undefeated Army football team, Dodd was a team captain his senior year and caught the winning touchdown pass against Navy in the 1922 Army–Navy Game.

== Army service ==
During Dodd's career in the Army, he received several U.S. military decorations, including the Bronze Star, Legion of Merit with oak leaf cluster, Army Commendation Medal with oak leaf cluster, Certificate of Achievement, American Defense Service Medal, American Campaign Medal, European–African–Middle Eastern Campaign Medal with three bronze service stars, World War II Victory Medal, Army of Occupation with Germany Clasp, Korean Service Medal with one bronze service star, United Nations Service Medal, and National Defense Service Medal.

== Korean War and Koje Island incident ==
In 1951, Dodd became deputy chief of staff for General James Van Fleet's Eighth Army, having risen in rank to brigadier general.

In February 1952, Dodd was ordered from Seoul to take command of the Geoje POW camp on Koje Island (currently Geojedo or Geoje Island) island after a U.S. soldier had been killed and 138 POWs wounded when the inmates of Compound 62 attacked an infantry battalion sent to forcibly screen POWs to determine whether they were military prisoners or civilian internees. On May 7, 1952, Dodd visited Compound 76, one of the prison compounds under his command, to listen to complaints aired by the leaders of the camp. While standing near the gate of the compound, he and one of his subordinates were forcibly seized as the gate opened to allow a work detail to pass through. The subordinate grabbed hold of a gatepost long enough for the American guards to rescue him, but Dodd was taken into the center of the camp and held hostage.

For the next 78 hours, Dodd was in captivity. By his own admission he was treated well as hurried negotiations went on for his release. General Charles F. Colson was rushed to the island to take command, and he ordered a telephone rigged up to allow communication with Dodd. The prisoners' chief demand was essentially an admission that UN forces had been responsible for bloodshed in the camps. This demand was granted by Colson and Dodd was eventually freed. Before he was released, he managed to talk his way out of a ceremonial goodbye, during which, he later recounted, he would've been decorated with flowers and escorted to the gate between formed lines of prisoners.

== After the Koje Island incident ==
General Clark chaired a board to review the incident. Both generals (Dodd and Colson) were criticized for handing a propaganda victory to the communist side rather than risk a forcible rescue of Dodd. Dodd was relieved of command and reduced in rank to colonel on May 23, 1952. Dodd was not informed of the board's existence, not allowed to appear before the review board, and was precluded from presenting any defense of his actions to the board. When Dodd requested a copy of the board's report, he was informed the material was classified as top secret and therefore was not available to him. He was forced to retire the next year.

He died at Brooke General Hospital in San Antonio, Texas on March 5, 1973, and was buried at Fort Sam Houston National Cemetery.

== Legacy ==
General Thomas M. Watlington made a presentation to the Secretary of the Army in attempt to correct the injustice of how Dodd was treated. General Van Fleet supported the presentation with his letters of praise for Dodd, which included the following statement; "Generally when officers take actions that prove successful, they are often promoted and decorated. In this case, both officers (Dodd and Colson) were pressured and their judgments proved beneficial in the long run. No one, and I repeat, no one, could have done a better job." In January 1977, four years after his death, the Army officially restored Dodd's rank to brigadier general.
