= United Nations Civil Assistance Command Korea =

1950–1953 United States Army civil affairs agency for South Korea

The United Nations Civil Assistance Command Korea (UNCACK) was a United States Army agency involved in civil affairs activities in the Republic of Korea (ROK) during the Korean War, from 1950 until 1953.

After the beginning of the Korean War in June 1950, the invasion of South Korea, and the rapid squeezing of Allied forces into the Pusan Perimeter, President Syngman Rhee of South Korea appealed for U.S. assistance. General Douglas MacArthur of the U.S. Army was serving as Commander-in-Chief of the United Nations Command (CINCUNC), the U.S. Army force defending South Korea. U.S. Army civil affairs efforts went through four different designations - the UN Public Health and Welfare Detachment; the United Nations Civil Assistance Command (UNCAC); the United Nations Civil Assistance Command, Korea (UNCACK); and the Korea Civil Assistance Command (KCAC). The term 8201st Army Unit was also frequently used.

General McArthur used U.S. Army personnel and equipment in Japan to name Brigadier General Crawford F. Sams in a staff role as the Chief of Health and Welfare, General Headquarters, United Nations Command. Brigadier General Sams was also tasked in a command role to lead the unit that would perform the mission on the ground, the small UN Public Health and Welfare Detachment.

Along with the United Nations Korean Reconstruction Agency (UNKRA), UNCACK was one of the major organizations providing humanitarian assistance to the ROK during the war.

The primary mission of UNCACK was "the prevention of disease, starvation and unrest among the civilian population", a mission implemented by providing a structure through which United Nations member nations could supply food, supplies, and technical assistance to Korea in cases when it was impossible to provide financial aid.

Following the cessation of hostilities in 1953, the duties of UNCACK were assumed by the U.S. Army's Korean Civil Assistance Command (KCAC).
