= United Nations Korean Reconstruction Agency =

1953–1958 UN program for South Korea

The United Nations Korean Reconstruction Agency (UNKRA) was an economic reconstruction program created by the United Nations to bolster war-devastated South Korea. The proposal for the program was drafted by the United States in 1950 after victory by United Nations forces appeared rapidly obtainable. On December 1, 1950, the General Assembly enacted the program. However, Chinese entrance into the Korean War by October 1950 had dispelled the expectation of promptly beginning a rebuilding program. After an armistice was agreed to in 1953, reconstruction began and focused on aiding war refugees and homeless. Nearly US$150 million was contributed to the program, a majority of funds were paid by South Korea's primary benefactor, the U.S.. The program closed in 1958 after no more funding was made available. The Chief of Mission from 1951 to 1953 was former Australian general, Charles Lloyd.

== See also ==
- United Nations Civil Assistance Corps Korea
