= 82nd Airborne Division =

Airborne division of the United States Army

- Insignia of the 82nd Airborne Division
- Active: 5 August 1917–27 May 1919; 24 June 1921–present
- Country: United States
- Branch: United States Army
- Type: Airborne light infantry
- Role: Airborne assault
- Size: Division
- Part of: XVIII Airborne Corps
- Garrison/HQ: Fort Bragg, North Carolina, US
- Nicknames: "America's Guard of Honor" "All American Division" "82nd Division" "Eighty Deuce" "The 82nd"
- Mottos: "All The Way!" “Death from Above”
- Color of berets: Maroon
- March: "The All-American Soldier"
- Engagements: World War I; St. Mihiel; Meuse-Argonne; Lorraine 1918; World War II; Sicily; Naples-Foggia; Normandy; Rhineland; Ardennes-Alsace; Central Europe; Vietnam War (3rd Brigade); Grenada invasion; Panama invasion; Southwest Asia; Defense of Saudi Arabia; Liberation of Kuwait; Kosovo Defense Campaign; Global War on Terrorism; Afghanistan War; Iraq War; Operation Inherent Resolve; Syria intervention; 2026 Iran war
- Decorations: Meritorious Unit Commendation
- Website: Official Website of the Division

Commanders
- Commander: MG Brandon R. Tegtmeier
- Deputy Commanding General – Operations: BG Andrew Kiser
- Deputy Commanding General – Support: BG Bryan Babich
- Deputy Commanding General – Plans: Brigadier Henry Llewelyn-Usher, British Army
- Command Sergeant Major: CSM James “JB” Bradshaw
- Notable commanders: Complete list of commanders

Insignia
- Shoulder sleeve insignia (subdued)

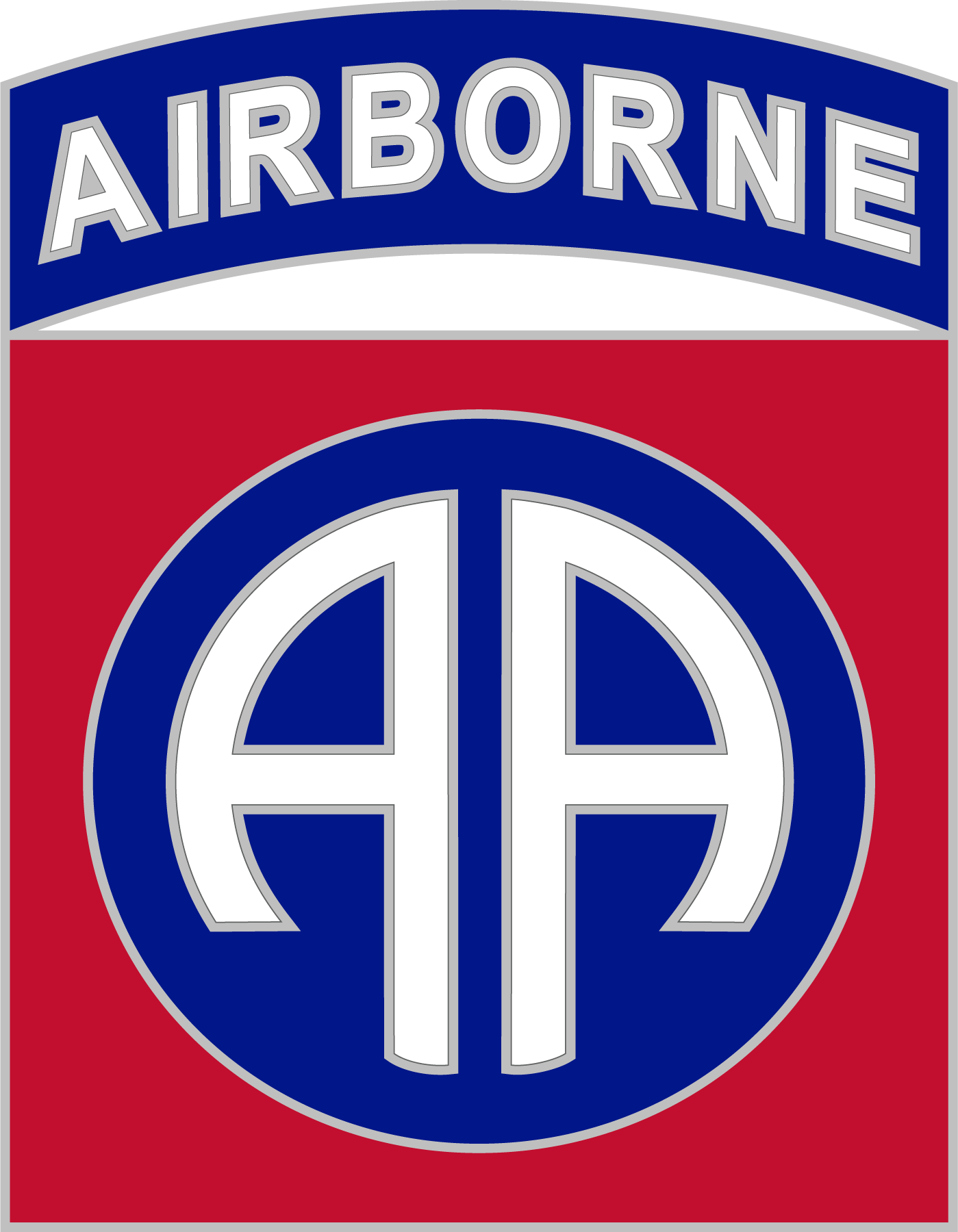
- Combat service identification badge

- Flag

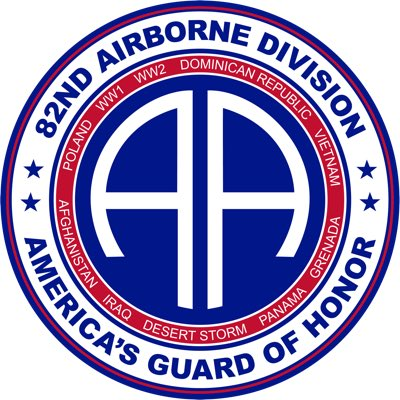
- Seal

- US Army Airborne Beret with 82nd AB Div. Flash

The 82nd Airborne Division ("All American") is a United States Army airborne infantry division that specializes in parachute assault, based in Fort Bragg, North Carolina. Currently, the division is commanded by Major General Brandon Tegtmeier.

It was first activated at Camp Gordon, in Georgia in August 1917. The 82nd Infantry Division was the second United States Army infantry-combat division of eight to deploy and return in England, and fight in France.

The 82nd Infantry Division served with distinction on the Western Front in the final months of World War I. Since its initial members came from all 48 states, the division acquired the nickname All-American, which is the basis for its "AA" (pictured), on the shoulder patch. The Division took part in the Battle of Lorraine 1918, and the campaigns of St. Mihiel and Meuse-Argonne 1918. It was demobilized in May 1919, at Camp Mills, New York. During the summer of 1921, it was reconstituted, placed into the Organized Reserves, as Headquarters, 82nd Division, and was later transferred to the Federal Building at Columbia, South Carolina.

After the attack on Pearl Harbor in Hawaii on 7 December 1941, the 82nd Airborne Division saw combat with the command of United States Army General Omar Bradley. In August 1942, Bradley reconstituted the 82nd as the first airborne division of the US Army, and it fought in numerous campaigns of the war.

== History ==
=== World War I ===
==== Formation ====
The 82nd Division was constituted during World War I on 5 August 1917 as an infantry division in the National Army. It was organized and formally activated on 25 August 1917 at Camp Gordon, Georgia. At the time, the division consisted entirely of newly conscripted soldiers. Original enlisted men assigned to the division came from Alabama, Georgia, and Tennessee. In October 1917, nearly all of them were transferred to fill shortages in National Guard and National Army units, principally the 30th, 31st, and 81st Divisions, which were training at other camps in the Southern United States.

Replacements for them were received mostly from Camp Devens, Massachusetts, Camp Dix, New Jersey, Camps Lee and Meade, Virginia, and Camp Upton, New York, the men hailing from New England and the Mid-Atlantic states. In the spring, 5,000 more replacements for transfers made over the winter were assigned from Fort Devens, Camp Gordon, Camp Upton, Camp Dodge, Iowa, and Camp Travis, Texas, along with a contingent of men from Alabama, Georgia, and Tennessee.

The citizens of Atlanta held a contest to give a nickname to the new division. In April 1918, Major General Eben Swift, the commanding general, chose "All American" to reflect the unique composition of the 82nd—it had soldiers from all 48 states in the Union. The bulk of the division was two infantry brigades, each commanding two regiments. The 163rd Brigade commanded the 325th Infantry Regiment and the 326th Infantry Regiment along with the 320th Machine Gun Battalion. The 164th Brigade commanded the 327th Infantry Regiment and the 328th Infantry Regiment and the 321st Machine Gun Battalion.

Also in the division were the 157th Field Artillery Brigade, composed of the 319th, 320th and 321st Field Artillery Regiments and the 307th Trench Mortar Battery; a divisional troops contingent, and a division train. The division sailed to Europe in May 1918 to join the American Expeditionary Forces (AEF), commanded by General John Pershing, on the Western Front. The 82nd Airborne Division was the first of five airborne divisions (11th, 13th, 17th, 82nd and 101st) to be formed in the United States during World War II. It was officially activated on 15 August 1942 at Fort Bragg in North Carolina, under the command of Major General Bradley with the classification of an airborne division.

==== Shoulder sleeve insignia ====
The division's square insignia, is identifiable by an arched red banner embroidered with the letters "AA" (standing for "All American") behind a shade of blue. It serves as the service colors of the United States Army, with red representing artillery and blue for infantry. A white on blue "Airborne" tab is worn above the insignia. "All American" is the nickname given to the division when it was first formed at Camp Gordon, Georgia, in 1917, submitted by Vivienne Goodwyn. The insignia was approved in 1918 during World War I.

The double “A” refers to the nickname “All American Division” adopted by the organization during World War I. The newly formed unit was composed of members, who came from all across all 48 states and given the nickname “All-American.” The shoulder sleeve insignia was redesigned for the 82nd Airborne Division and an Airborne tab was added on top, authorized on August 31, 1942.

==== Training ====
Brigadier General William P. Burnham, who had previously commanded the 164th Brigade, led the division during most of its training and movement to Europe. In early April 1918, the division embarked from the ports in Boston, New York City and Brooklyn to Liverpool, England, where the division fully assembled by mid-May 1918. From there, the division moved to Continental Europe, leaving Southampton and arriving at Le Havre, France.

The 82nd Division then moved to the British-controlled sector of the Somme, where it began sending small numbers of troops and officers to the front lines to gain combat experience. On 16 June, it moved by rail to the French sector. The division was briefly assigned to I Corps before falling under the command of IV Corps until late August. It was then moved to the Woëvre front.

==== Combat chronicle ====
===== Battle of Saint-Mihiel =====
As part of the American Expeditionary Forces (AEF) deployed during WWI, the 82nd Division began training with British forces in Picardy as early as 10 May 1918. From there they moved to the hotly contested French border region of Lorraine, which they occupied from 16 June to 11 September in preparation for the Saint-Mihiel offensive.

As the attack on the Saint-Mihiel salient began on 12 September, the division engaged in a holding mission to prevent Imperial German Army forces from attacking the right flank of the First Army. This defensive action allowed the 163rd Brigade and 327th Infantry Regiment to advance north-east, raiding the communes of Port-sur-Seille, Eply, Bois de Cheminot, and Bois Fréhaut. Meanwhile, the 328th Infantry Regiment advanced on the west of the Moselle River, made contact with the 90th Division, and entered the town of Norroy, to consolidate American troop positions.

By 17 September, the Saint-Mihiel offensive had stabilized, and preparations for the infamous Meuse-Argonne offensive began. On 20 September, the 82nd Division was relieved by the French 69th Division. The 82nd Division was then stationed near Triaucourt and Rarécourt, near the First Army. During this operation, the 82nd Division suffered casualties from heavy artillery fire which the fresh American soldiers were completely unused to. The division was moved into reserve from 26 September to 3 October while it assembled near Varennes-en-Argonne to train and prepare for the Meuse-Argonne offensive.

===== Meuse-Argonne Offensive =====
The division mobilized to the Clermont area in Argonne, just west of Verdun, starting on 24 September, stationed there to act as a reserve for the US First Army. On 3 October, Major General George B. Duncan, commander of the 77th Division, relieved William Burnham of his duties and took over as commander of the 82nd.

On the night of 6 October 1918, the 164th Brigade relieved troops of the 28th Division, which were holding the front line from south of Fléville to La Forge, along the eastern bank of the Aire River. On 7 October, the 82nd Division, minus the 163rd Brigade, which remained in reserve, attacked the northeastern edge of the Argonne Forest, taking "Hill 223" in the process. The division's right flank entered the commune of Cornay but later withdrew southeast. The division's left flank took the high ground northwest of Châtel-Chéhéry. On 9 October, the division's left flank advanced to form a line along the French pylons on the road to the Belgian city of la Louvière.

Throughout October, the division advanced north-east along the Aire (Aisne) river. On 10 October, it relieved troops of the 1st Division in Ardennes at Fléville and Sommerance. The 82nd Division then relaunched an attack on Cornay and the Belgian city of Enghien, successfully re-establishing the front there. On 11 October, the right flank of the division took the high ground north of the Rance river while the left flank continued to advance along the Aire. The next day, the 42nd Division relieved the 82nd's troops in Sommerance. Attacking with fresh troops, the 82nd broke through the Hindenburg line on 15 October.

On 18 October, the 82nd Division relieved the 78th division at Champigneulle. Three days later it advanced to the Ravin aux Pierres. On 31 October, the 82nd, except the artillery, was relieved by the 77th Division and the 80th Division, and assembled in the Argonne Forest to regroup. On 10 November, it moved again to training areas in Bourmont, where it remained until the Armistice of 11 November 1918.

The division's square Insignia

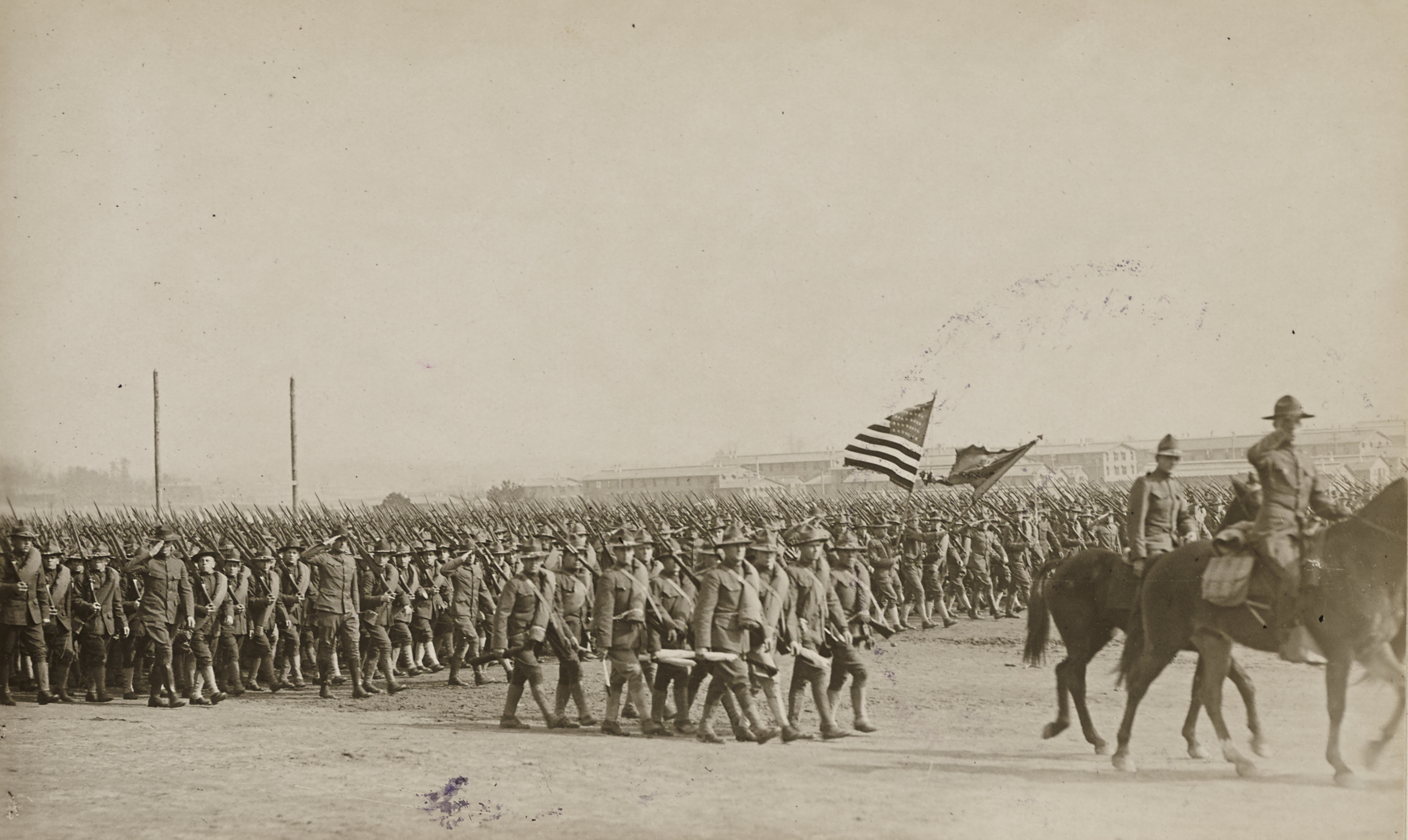
A review of the 328th Infantry Regiment at Camp Gordon, Chamblee, Georgia, February 1918

==== Post-war ====
The division suffered 995 killed and 7,082 wounded, for a total of 8,077 casualties. Following the war's end, the division moved to training areas near Prauthoy, where it remained to February 1919. It returned to the United States in April and May, and was demobilized and deactivated at Camp Mills, New York, on 27 May.

=== Interwar period ===
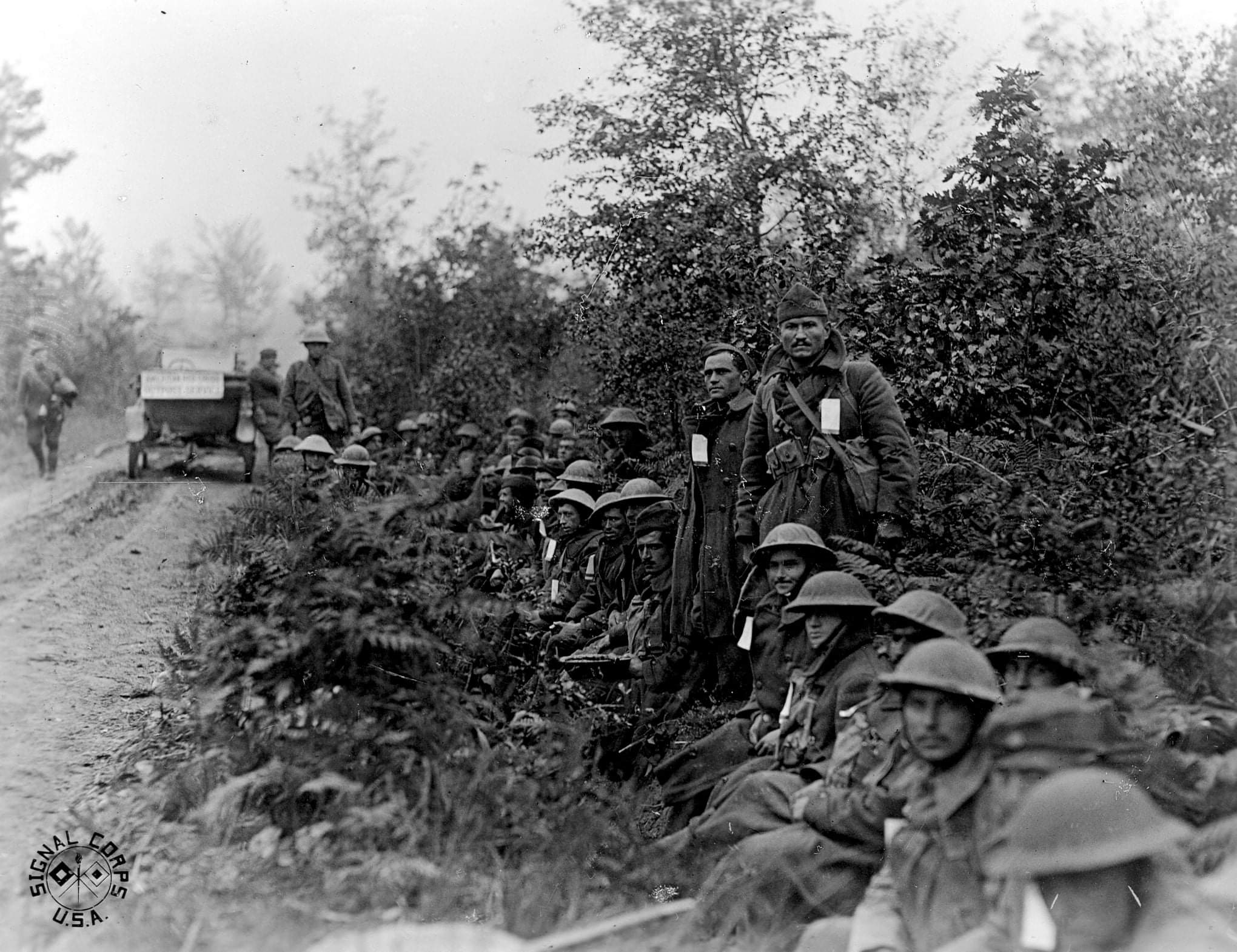
Members of the 82nd Division on the road to Ravin aux Pierre (lit. "Stone Ravine") France, October 1918

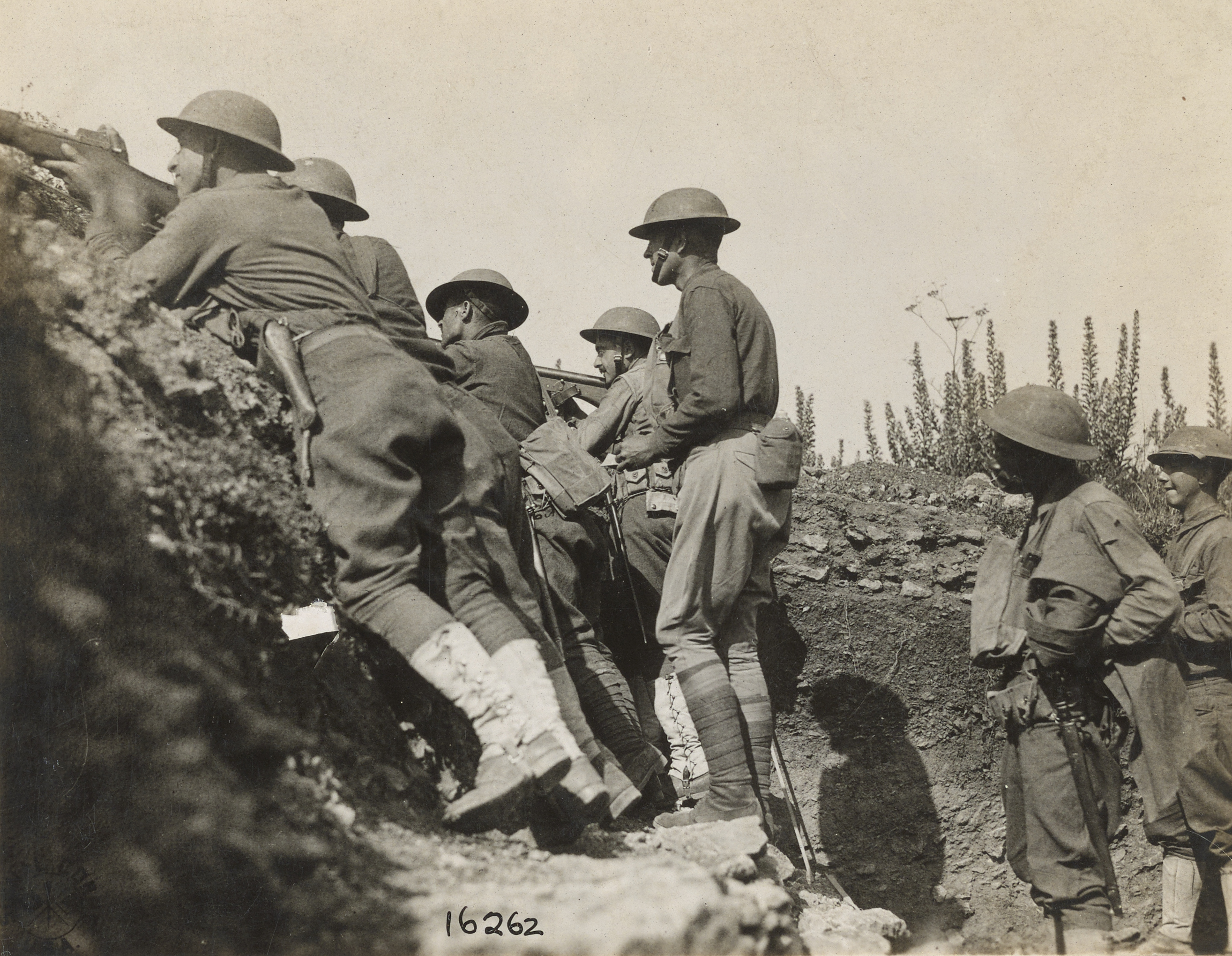
Doughboys of Company B, 328th Infantry Regiment, 82nd Division, serving in a front line trench, France, July 1918

Pursuant to the National Defense Act of 1920, the 82nd Division was reconstituted in the Organized Reserve on 24 June 1921, allotted to the Fourth Corps Area, assigned to the XIV Corps, and further allotted to Florida, Georgia, and South Carolina as its home area. The division headquarters was organized on 23 September 1921 at 1202-1/2 Main Street in Columbia, South Carolina. In 1923, it relocated to the Post Office Building, where it remained until activated for World War II.

The 82nd Division's designated mobilization station was Camp McClellan, Alabama, also where much of the unit's annual training activities occurred in the interwar years. The headquarters usually trained at Camp McClellan, but also occasionally trained with the staff of the 8th Infantry Brigade, 4th Division. The 82nd Division's infantry regiments held their annual training primarily with the units of the 8th Infantry Brigade, while other units, such as the special troops, artillery, engineers, aviation, medical, and quartermaster units, usually trained alongside the active elements of the 4th Division at various posts in the Fourth Corps Area.

For example, the division artillery trained with the units of the 13th Field Artillery Brigade at Fort Bragg, North Carolina; the 307th Engineer Regiment alongside Company A, 4th Engineer Regiment at Fort Benning, Georgia; the 307th Medical Regiment trained at the medical officers training camp at Fort Oglethorpe, Georgia; and the 307th Observation Squadron with Air Corps units at Maxwell Field, Alabama.

The infantry regiments of the division rotated responsibility to conduct the Citizens' Military Training Camps each year at Camp McClellan. The division participated in Fourth Corps Area or Third Army command post exercises in conjunction with other Regular Army, National Guard and Organized Reserve units, but unlike Regular and Guard units, the 82nd Division did not participate as an organized unit in the Fourth Corps Area maneuvers and the Third Army maneuvers of 1938, 1940, and 1941 due to a lack of enlisted personnel and equipment, with the officers and a few enlisted reservists assigned to fill vacant slots in organized units to bring them to war strength for the exercises, with others assigned duties as umpires or support personnel.

==== Order of battle, 1939 ====
- Headquarters (Columbia, SC)
- Headquarters, Special Troops (Columbia, SC)
- Headquarters Company (Columbia, SC)
- 163rd Infantry Brigade (Atlanta, GA)
  - 325th Infantry Regiment (Albany, GA)
  - 326th Infantry Regiment (Atlanta, GA)
- 164th Infantry Brigade (Tampa, FL)
  - 327th Infantry Regiment (Greenville, SC)
  - 328th Infantry Regiment (Tampa, FL)
- 157th Field Artillery Brigade (Spartanburg, SC)
  - 319th Field Artillery Regiment (Decatur, GA)
  - 320th Field Artillery Regiment (Spartanburg, SC)
  - 321st Field Artillery Regiment (Macon, GA)
  - 307th Ammunition Train (Newberry, SC)
- 307th Engineer Regiment (Jacksonville, FL)
- 307th Medical Regiment (Macon, GA)
- 407th Quartermaster Regiment (Augusta, GA)
- 82nd Military Police Company (Columbia, SC)
- 82nd Signal Company (Macon, GA)
- 307th Ordnance Company (Medium) (Savannah, GA)
- 82nd Tank Company (Light) (Columbus, GA)

=== World War II ===
==== Initial training and conversion ====
Before Organized Reserve infantry divisions were ordered into active military service, they were reorganized on paper as "triangular" divisions under the 1940 tables of organization. The headquarters companies of the two infantry brigades were consolidated into the division's cavalry reconnaissance troop, and one infantry regiment was removed by inactivation. The field artillery brigade headquarters and headquarters battery became the headquarters. The headquarters battery of the division artillery, and its three field artillery regiments, were reorganized into four battalions. The engineer, medical, and quartermaster regiments were reorganized into battalions.

In 1942, divisional quartermaster battalions were split into ordnance light maintenance companies and quartermaster companies. The division's headquarters and military police company, which had previously been a combined unit, was split.

The 82nd Division was redesignated on 13 February 1942 as Division Headquarters, 82nd Division, and ordered into active service on 25 March 1942, at Camp Claiborne, Louisiana, under the command of Major General Omar N. Bradley. The officer and enlisted cadre mostly came from the 9th Infantry Division. The enlisted men came from reception centers in the Midwest, South, and Southwest. During this period, the division brought together three officers who would ultimately steer the US Army during the following two decades: Matthew Ridgway, James M. Gavin, and Maxwell D. Taylor. Under Major General Bradley, the 82nd Division's Chief of staff was George Van Pope.

On 15 August 1942, the 82nd Infantry Division, now commanded by Major General Ridgway, became the first airborne division in the history of the US Army, and was redesignated as the 82nd Airborne Division. The 82nd was selected after deliberations by the US Army General Staff because of a number of factors. It was not a Regular Army or National Guard unit, its personnel had all completed basic training, and it was stationed in an area that had good weather and flying facilities. Historian John B. Wilson wrote that "many traditionalists in those components wanted nothing to do with such an experimental force". James M. Gavin wrote that many states would refuse the conversion of their National Guard units, likely because of the additional expenses needed to maintain facilities for airborne units.

The division initially consisted of the 325th, 326th and 327th Infantry Regiments, and supporting units. The 327th was soon transferred to help form the 101st Airborne Division and was replaced by the 504th Parachute Infantry Regiment, leaving the division with two regiments of glider infantry and one of parachute infantry. In February 1943 the division received another change when the 326th was transferred to the 13th Airborne Division, being replaced by the 505th Parachute Infantry Regiment, under James M. Gavin, then a colonel, who was later to command the division.

==== Combat chronicle ====
===== North Africa and Italy =====
In April 1943, paratroopers from the 82nd, under the command of Major General Ridgway, sailed into the Mediterranean Theater of Operations and landed in North Africa as part of the Allied plan to invade Sicily. The division's first two combat operations were parachute assaults into Sicily on 9 July and Salerno on 13 September 1943. The initial assault on Sicily, by the 505th Parachute Regimental Combat Team, under Colonel Gavin, was the first regimental-sized combat parachute assault conducted by the United States Army. The first glider assault did not occur until Operation Neptune as part of the D-Day landings of 6 June 1944. Troopers arrived in Italy by landing craft at Maiori, Naples, and Salerno.

During the invasion of Italy, Ridgway considered Will Lang Jr. of TIME magazine an honorary member of the division.

In January 1944, the 504th, commanded by Colonel Reuben Tucker, which was temporarily detached to fight at Anzio, adopted the nickname "Devils in Baggy Pants", taken from an entry in a German officer's diary.

===== Normandy =====
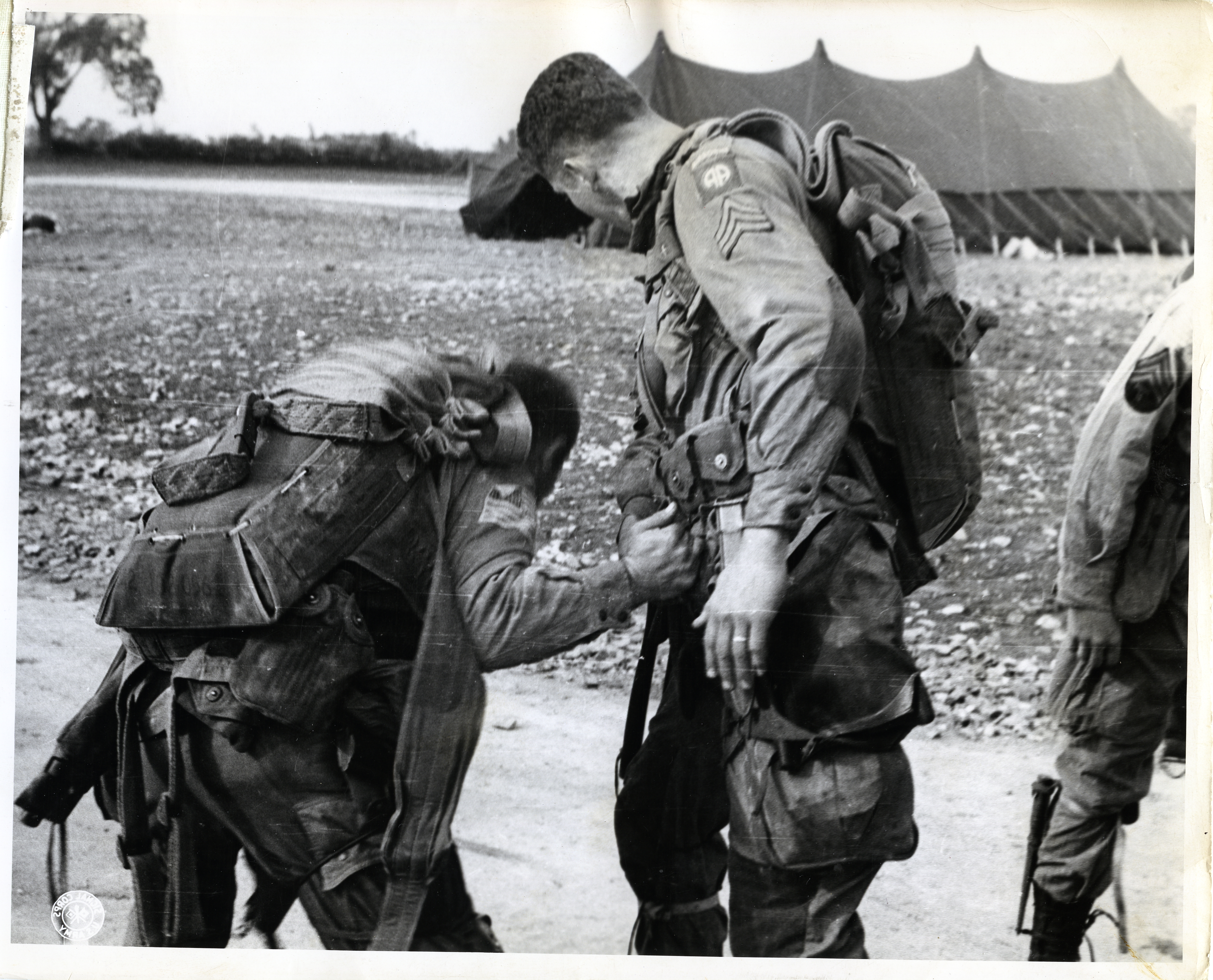
Members of the 508th PIR, 82nd Airborne Division, check their equipment before taking off from an airfield in Saltby, Leicestershire, England, to participate in the invasion of Europe, 1944.

With two air drops under its belt, the 82nd Airborne was ready for the second "D-Day" operation in the division's history; Operation Neptune, or the amphibious assault portion of Allied invasion of Normandy. The division conducted Mission Boston, a component of the Operation Overlord plan.

In preparation for the operation, the division was significantly reorganized. To ease the integration of replacement troops, rest, and refitting following the fighting in Italy, the 504th PIR did not rejoin the division for the invasion. Two new parachute infantry regiments (PIRs), the 507th and the 508th, provided it, along with the veteran 505th, a three-parachute infantry regiment punch. The 325th was also reinforced by the addition of the 3rd Battalion of the 401st GIR, bringing it up to a strength of three battalions.

On 5 and 6 June these paratroopers, parachute artillery elements, and the 319th and 320th, boarded hundreds of transport planes and gliders to begin history's largest airborne assault at the time. Only Operation Market Garden later that year would be larger. During the 6 June assault, a 508th platoon leader, First lieutenant Robert P. Mathias, was the first US Army officer killed by German fire during the invasion. On 7 June, after this first wave of attack, the 325th GIR arrived by glider to provide a division reserve.

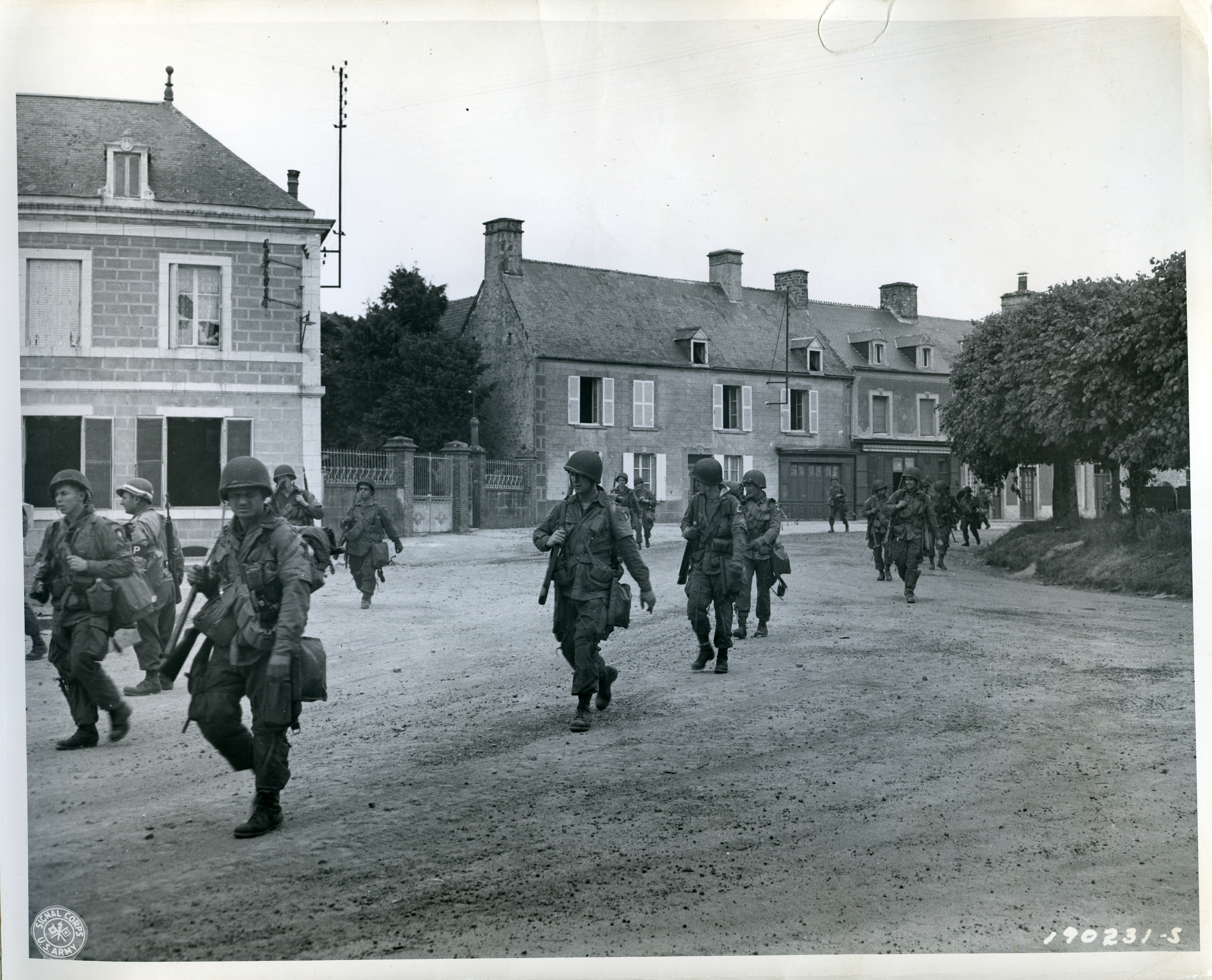
U.S. paratroopers moving through Sainte-Marie-du-Mont, 7 June 1944

In Normandy, the 82nd gained its first Medal of Honor of the war, belonging to Private first class Charles N. DeGlopper of the 325th GIR. When the division was relieved in early July, the 82nd had seen a month straight of severe combat. Casualties were heavy. Losses included 5,245 troopers killed, wounded, or missing- a 46% casualty rate. Major General Ridgway's post-battle report stated in part, "... 33 days of action without relief, without replacements. Every mission accomplished. No ground gained was ever relinquished."

Following Normandy, the 82nd Airborne Division returned to England to rest and refit for future airborne operations. The 82nd became part of the newly organized XVIII Airborne Corps, which consisted of the 17th, 82nd, and 101st Airborne Divisions. Ridgway was given command of the corps but was not officially promoted to lieutenant general until 1945. His recommendation for succession as division commander was Brigadier General James M. Gavin, previously the 82nd's assistant division commander. Upon being promoted to major general in October 1944 at the age of 37, Gavin became the youngest general since the Civil War to command a US Army division.

===== Market Garden =====
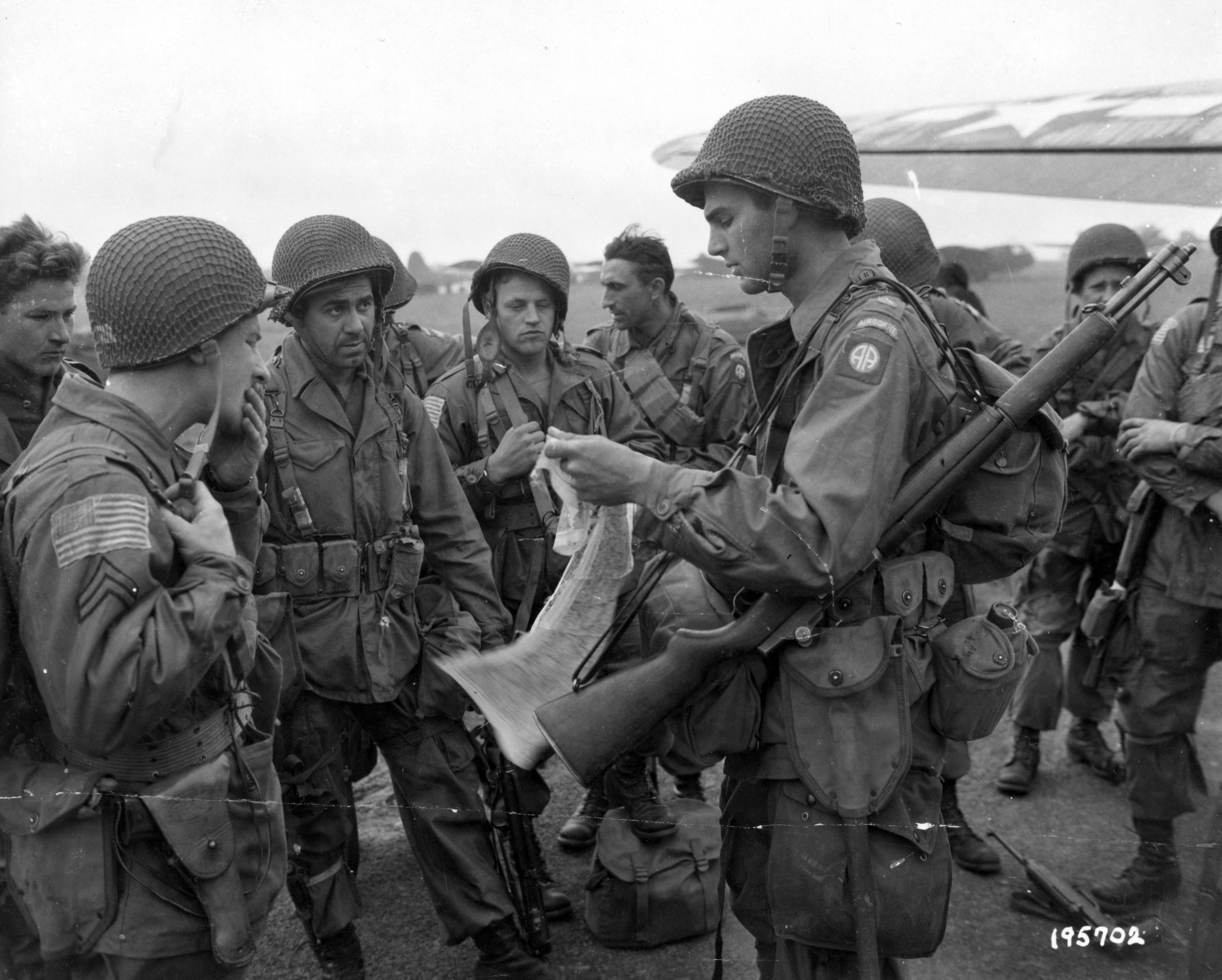
Members of the 82nd Airborne Division at Cottesmore Airfield during preparations for Operation Market Garden, 17 September 1944

On 2 August 1944, the division became part of the First Allied Airborne Army. In September, planning for Operation Market Garden, the Allied invasion of the Netherlands, began in earnest. The operation called for three, at minimum, airborne divisions to seize and hold key bridges and roads deep behind German lines. The 504th PIR, now back at full strength, was reassigned to the 82nd, while the 507th was assigned to the 17th Airborne Division, at the time training in England.

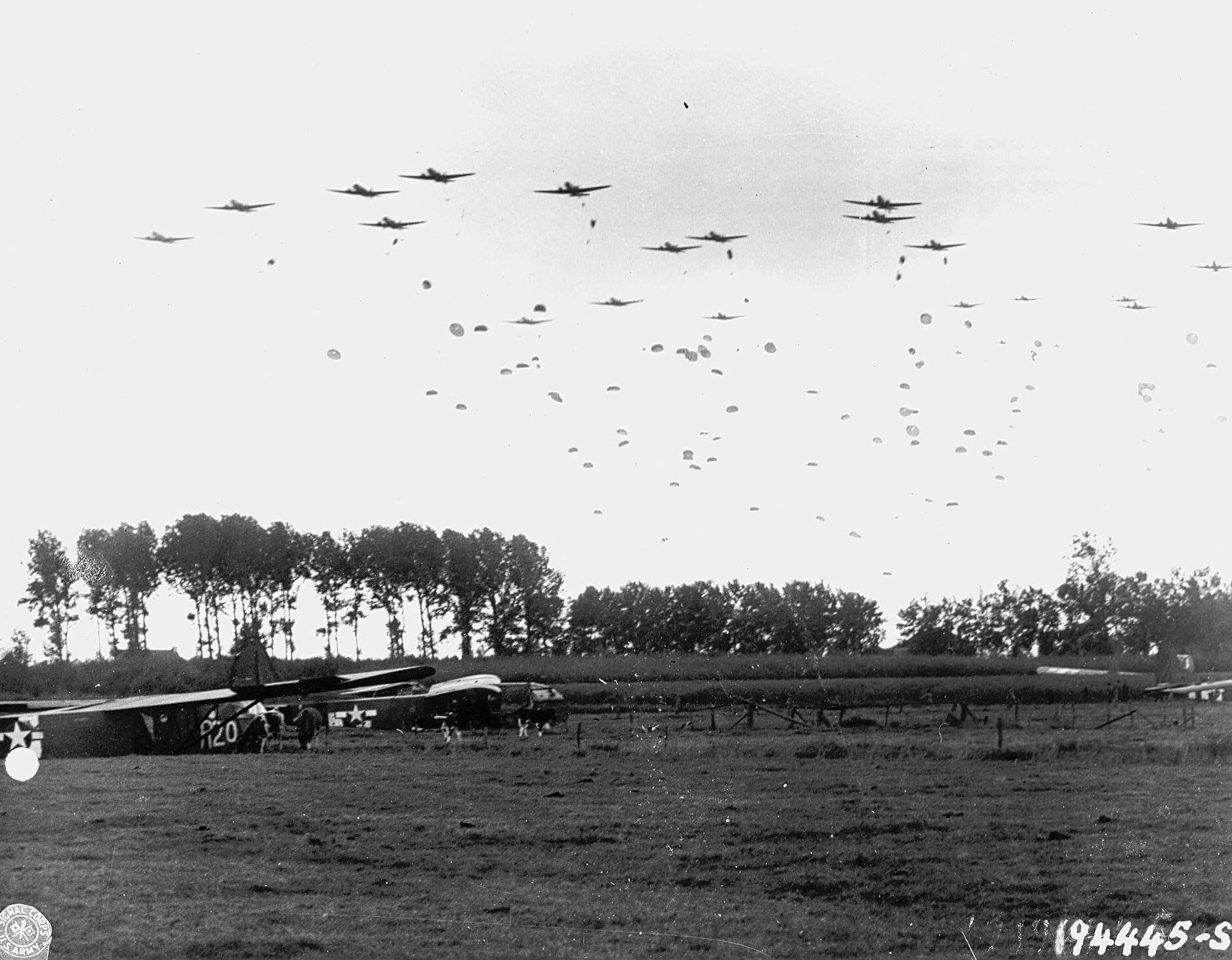
Men of the 82nd Airborne Division drop near Grave in the Netherlands during Operation Market Garden.

On 17 September, the "All American" Division conducted its fourth and final combat jump of World War II. Fighting off German counterattacks, the division captured its objectives between Grave, and Nijmegen. The division failed to initially capture Nijmegen Bridge when the opportunity presented itself early in the battle. When the British XXX Corps arrived in Nijmegen, six hours ahead of schedule, they found themselves having to fight to take a bridge that should have already been in Allied hands.

In the afternoon of Wednesday 20 September 1944, the 82nd Airborne Division successfully conducted an opposed assault crossing of the Waal river. War correspondent Bill Downs, who witnessed the assault, described it as "a single, isolated battle that ranks in magnificence and courage with Guam, Tarawa, Omaha Beach. A story that should be told to the blowing of bugles and the beating of drums for the men whose bravery made the capture of this crossing over the Waal possible."

The Market Garden salient was held in a defensive operation for several weeks until the 82nd was relieved by Canadian troops, and sent into reserve in France. During the operation, 19-year-old Private John R. Towle of the 504th PIR was posthumously awarded the 82nd Airborne Division's second Medal of Honor of World War II.

===== Battle of the Bulge =====
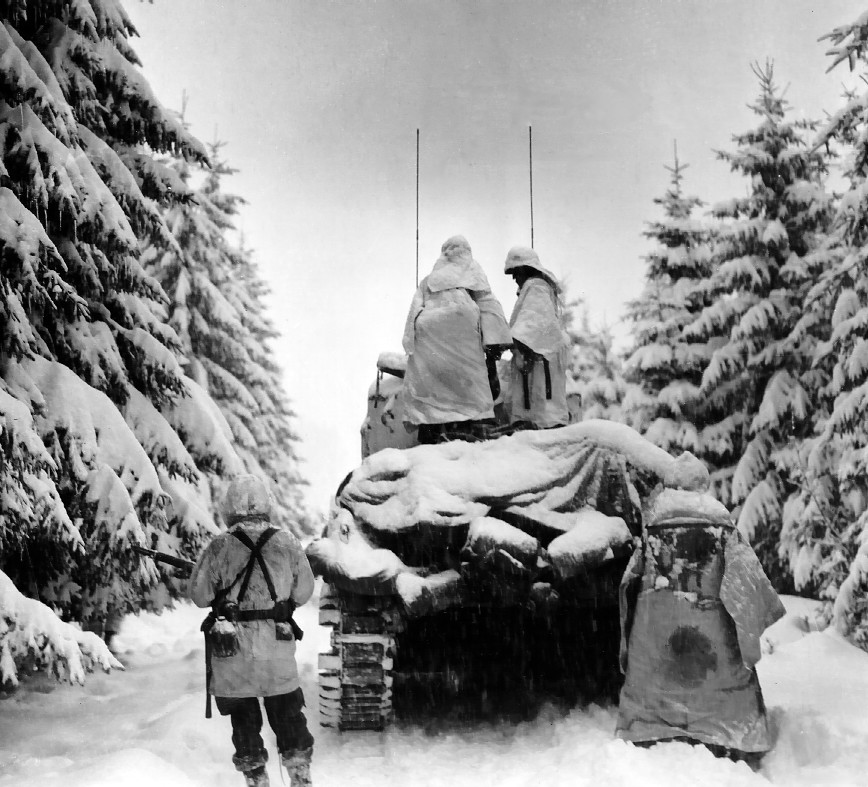
Men of the 504th Parachute Infantry Regiment advancing through a snow-covered forest during the Battle of the Bulge, December 1944

On 16 December 1944, the Germans launched a surprise offensive through the Ardennes Forest, which became known as the Battle of the Bulge. In SHAEF reserve, the 82nd was committed on the northern face of the bulge near Elsenborn Ridge.

On 20 December 1944, the 82nd Airborne Division was assigned to take Cheneux which had been captured by Kampfgruppe Peiper. On 21–22 December 1944, the 82nd Airborne faced counterattacks from two Waffen SS divisions which included the 1st SS Panzer Division Leibstandarte SS Adolf Hitler (lit. translation "The SS Bodyguard Division of Adolf Hitler") and the 9th SS Panzer Division Hohenstaufen. The Waffen SS efforts to relieve the Kampfgruppe Peiper failed due to the stubborn defense of the 82nd Airborne, the 30th ID, 2nd ID, and other units.

On December 23, German forces launched an attack from the south, overrunning elements of the 325th Glider Infantry Regiment at the Baraque-Fraiture crossroads. This maneuver compromised the southern flank of the 82nd Airborne Division. The objective of the 2nd SS Panzer Division Das Reich was to outflank the 82nd Airborne Division rather than to directly link up with the isolated Kampfgruppe Peiper further north. However, a successful encirclement could have opened a corridor to reach the cut-off armored unit. The German offensive failed to achieve this breakthrough before American reinforcements stabilized the perimeter.

On 24 December 1944, the 82nd Airborne Division with an official strength of 8,520 men was facing off against a vastly superior combined force of 43,000 men and over 1,200 armored fighting and artillery vehicles and pieces. Due to these circumstances, the 82nd Airborne Division was forced to withdrawal for the first time in its combat history. The Germans pursued their retreat with the 2nd and 9th SS Panzer Divisions. The 2nd SS Panzer Division Das Reich engaged the 82nd until 28 December when it and what was left of the 1st SS Panzer Division Leibstandarte were ordered to move south to meet General George Patton's forces attacking in the area of Bastogne.

Some units of the 9th SS Panzer including the 19th Panzer Grenadier Regiment stayed and fought the 82nd. They were joined by the 62nd Volksgrenadier Division. The 9th SS Panzer tried to breakthrough by attacking the 508 and 504 PIR positions, but ultimately failed. The failure of the 9th and 2nd SS Panzer Divisions to break through the 82nd lines marked the end of the German offensive in the northern shoulder of the Bulge. The German objective now became one of defense.

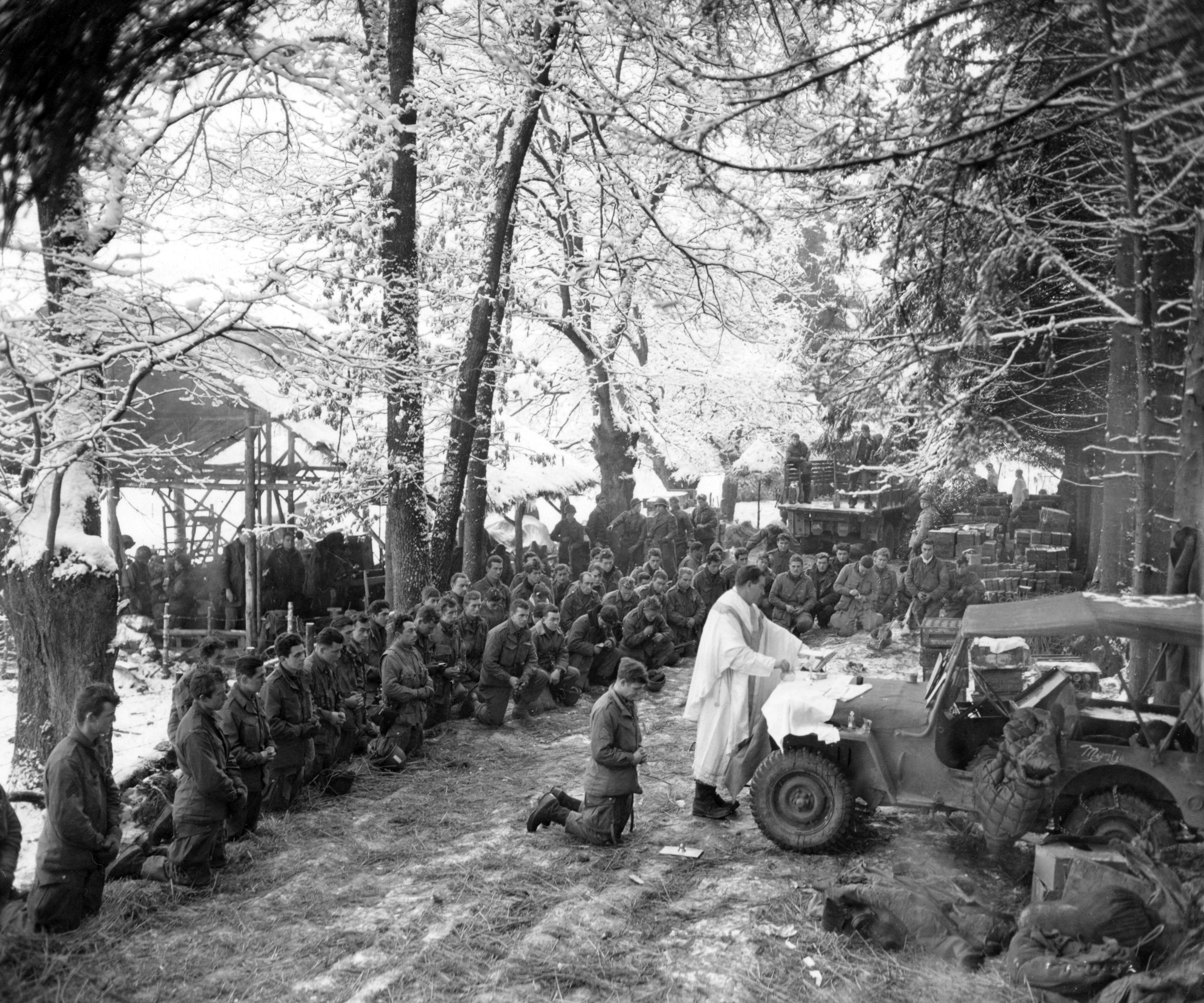
Chaplain Joseph P. Kenny holding Mass for men of the 508th Parachute Infantry Regiment in Belgium, January 1945

On 3 January 1945, the 82nd Airborne Division conducted a counterattack. On the first day's fighting the 82nd Airborne overran the 62nd Volksgrenadiers and the 9th SS Panzer's positions capturing 2,400 prisoners. The 82nd Airborne suffered high casualties in the process. The attached 551st Parachute Infantry Battalion was all but destroyed during these attacks. Of the 826 men who went into the Ardennes, only 110 came out. Having lost its charismatic leader Lt. Colonel Joerg, and almost all its men either wounded, killed, or frostbitten, the 551 was never reconstituted. The few soldiers who remained were later absorbed into units of the 82nd Airborne.

After several days of fighting, the destruction of the 62nd Volksgrenadiers, and what had been left of the 9th SS Panzer Division was complete. For the 82nd Airborne Division the first part of the Battle of the Bulge had ended.

===== Into Germany =====
After helping to secure the Ruhr, the 82nd Airborne Division took over Ludwigslust past the Elbe River, accepting the surrender of over 150,000 men of Lieutenant General Kurt von Tippelskirch's 21st Army on 2 May 1945. General Omar Bradley, commanding the US 12th Army Group, stated in a 1975 interview with Gavin that Field Marshal Sir Bernard Montgomery, commanding the Anglo-Canadian 21st Army Group, had told him that German opposition was too great to cross the Elbe. When Gavin's 82nd crossed the river, in company with the British 6th Airborne Division, the 82nd Airborne Division moved 36 miles in one day and captured over 100,000 troops, causing great laughter in Bradley's 12th Army Group headquarters.

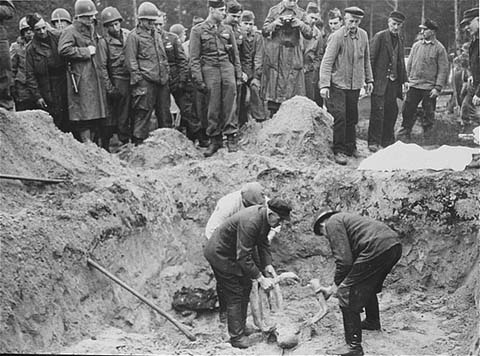
82nd Airborne Division soldiers supervising German civilians exhuming a mass grave at Wöbbelin, May 1945

Following Germany's surrender, the 82nd Airborne Division entered Berlin for occupation duty, replacing the 2nd Armored Division in August 1945. The division was relieved by the 78th Infantry Division early in November 1945. While in Berlin, General George S. Patton was so impressed with the 82nd's "honor guard" that he said, "In all my years in the Army and all the honor guards I have ever seen, the 82nd's honor guard is undoubtedly the best." Hence the "All-American" became also known as "America's Guard of Honor". The war ended before their scheduled participation in the Allied invasion of Japan, Operation Downfall.

==== Division organization ====
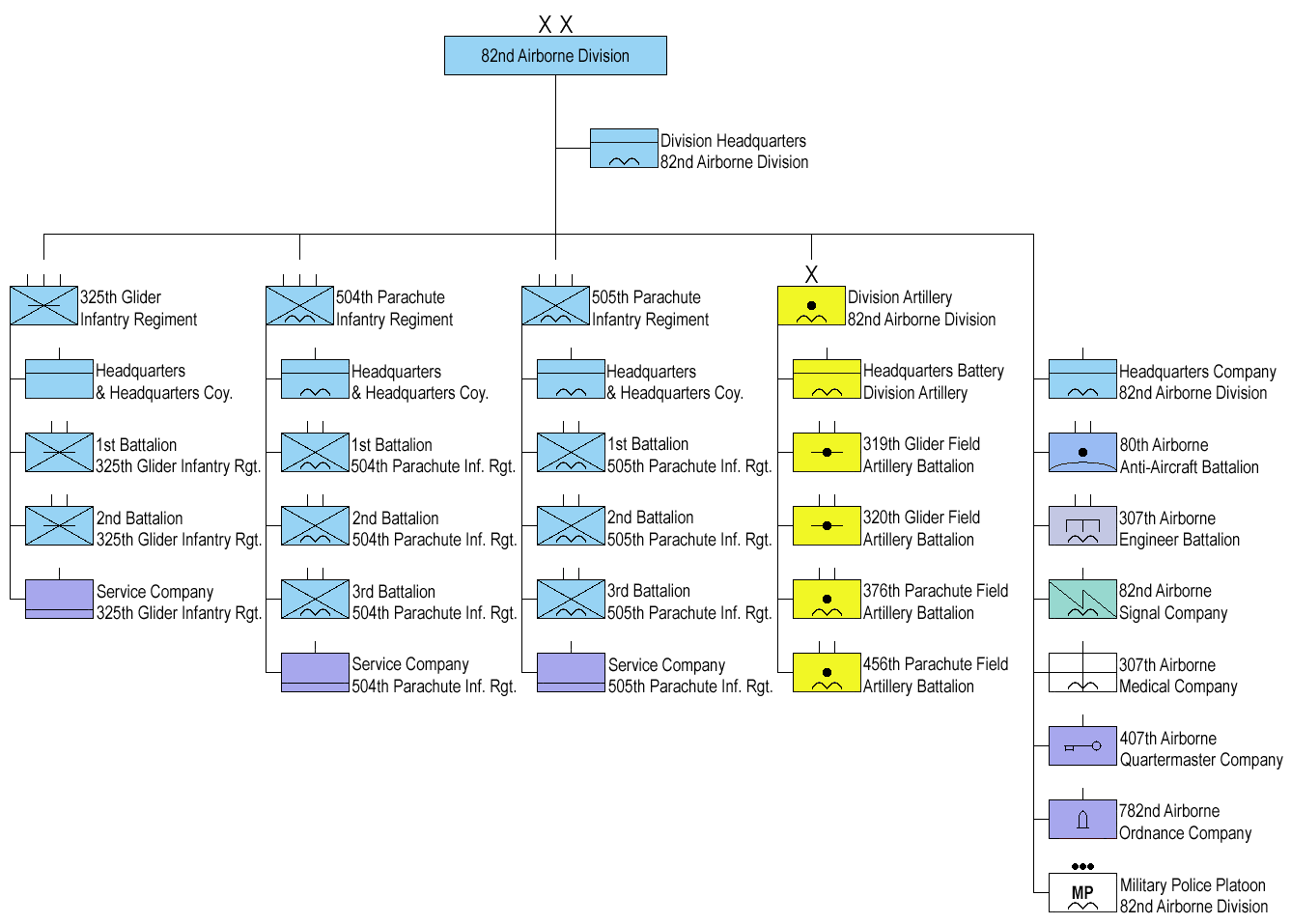
82nd Airborne Division organization before 1 March 1945 (click to enlarge)

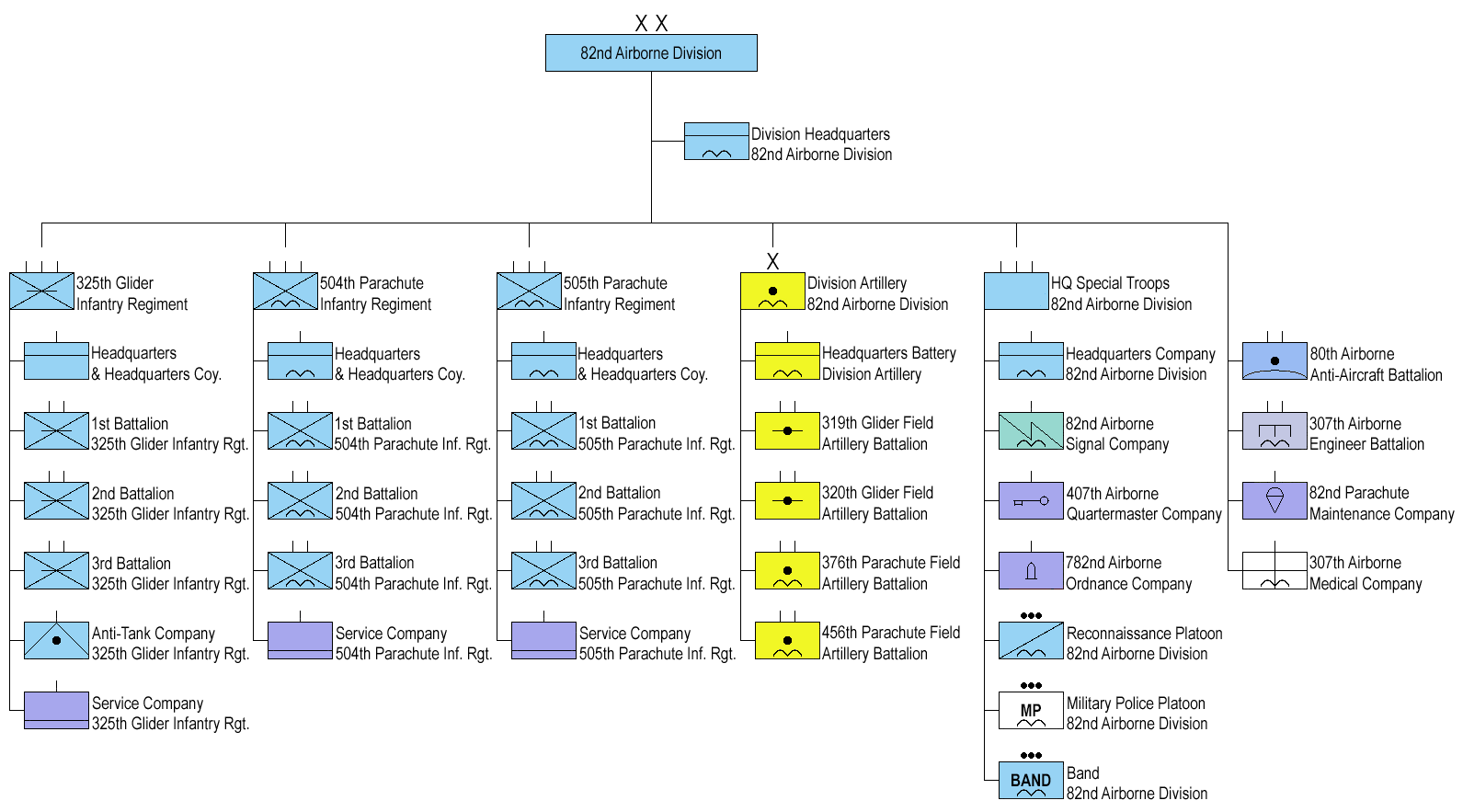
82nd Airborne Division organization after 1 March 1945 (click to enlarge)

The 82nd Airborne Division was composed of the following units:

- 82nd Airborne Division
  - Division Headquarters
  - 325th Glider Infantry Regiment (325th GIR) (received the 2nd Battalion, 401st GIR, 101st Airborne Division on 1 March 1945, which became the 3rd Battalion, 325th GIR)
    - Headquarters and Headquarters Company
    - 2× glider infantry battalions (3× glider infantry battalions from 1 March 1945)
      - each battalion consists of: 1× Headquarters and Headquarters Company, 3× Rifle companies
    - Anti-Tank Company (assigned 1 March 1945)
    - Service Company
  - 504th Parachute Infantry Regiment (504th PIR)
    - Headquarters and Headquarters Company
    - 3× parachute infantry battalions
      - each battalion consists of: 1× Headquarters and Headquarters Company, 3× Rifle companies
    - Service Company
  - 505th Parachute Infantry Regiment (505th PIR)
    - same organization as 504th Parachute Infantry Regiment
  - 82nd Airborne Division Artillery
    - Headquarters Battery
    - 319th Glider Field Artillery Battalion
      - Headquarters and Headquarters and Service Battery
      - 2× Batteries (M1 75mm pack howitzers)
    - 320th Glider Field Artillery Battalion
      - same organization as 319th Glider Field Artillery Battalion
    - 376th Parachute Field Artillery Battalion
      - Headquarters and Headquarters and Service Battery
      - 3× Batteries (M1 75mm pack howitzers)
      - Anti-Aircraft and Anti-Tank Battery (M2 .50-caliber machine guns, M3 37mm Anti-Tank guns, and M1 Bazookas)
    - 456th Parachute Field Artillery Battalion
      - same organization as 376th Parachute Field Artillery Battalion
  - Special Troops (Headquarters activated 1 March 45, until then the units below were directly under the Division Headquarters)
    - Headquarters Company, 82nd Airborne Division
    - 82nd Airborne Signal Company
    - 407th Airborne Quartermaster Company
    - 782nd Airborne Ordnance Company
    - Reconnaissance Platoon (assigned 1 March 45)
    - Military Police Platoon
    - Band (assigned 1 March 45)
  - 80th Airborne Anti-Aircraft Artillery Battalion
    - Headquarters and Headquarters Detachment
    - 3× Automatic weapon batteries (M3 37mm Anti-Tank guns and from June 1944 M1 57mm anti-tank guns)
    - 3× Machine gun batteries (M2 .50-caliber machine guns)
  - 307th Airborne Engineer Battalion
    - Headquarters and Headquarters and Service Company
    - 2× Glider engineer companies
    - 1× Parachute engineer company
  - 82nd Parachute Maintenance Company (provisional unit made permanent on 1 March 1945)
  - 307th Airborne Medical Company

Attached paratrooper units:

- 507th Parachute Infantry Regiment (attached 14 June 1944 – 27 August 1944)
- 508th Parachute Infantry Regiment (attached 14 June 1944 – 21 June 1944; 23 January 1945 through 9 May 1945)
- 517th Parachute Infantry Regiment (attached 1–11 January 1945; 23–26 January 1945; 3–5 February 1945; 9–10 February 1945)
- 551st Parachute Infantry Battalion (attached 26 December 1944 – 13 January 1945; 21–27 January 1945)

==== Casualties ====
- Total battle casualties: 9,073
- Killed in action: 1,619
- Wounded in action: 6,560
- Missing in action: 279
- Prisoner of war: 615

==== Awards ====
During World War II the division and its members were awarded the following awards:

- Distinguished Unit Citations: 15
- Medal of Honor: 4
  - Private John R. Towle^{(KIA)}
  - Private First Class Charles N. Deglopper^{(KIA)}
  - First Sergeant Leonard A. Funk Jr.
  - Private Joe Gandara^{(KIA)} (issued 18 March 2014)
- Distinguished Service Cross: 37
- Distinguished Service Medal: 2
- Silver Star: 898
- Legion of Merit: 29
- Soldier's Medal: 49
- Bronze Star Medal: 1,894
- Air Medal: 15

=== Cold War ===
==== Post–World War II ====
82nd Airborne Division, circa 1952

The 82nd Airborne division returned to the United States on 3 January 1946 on the RMS Queen Mary. The 82nd initially was staged at Camp Shanks, New York, where they drilled for the coming Victory Parade, to be held in New York City on 12 January 1946. In 1947 the 555th Parachute Infantry Battalion was assigned to the 82nd and was reflagged as the 3d Battalion, 505th Parachute Infantry Regiment, redesignated as the 505th Airborne Infantry Regiment effective 15 December 1947.

Instead of being demobilized, the 82nd found a permanent home at Fort Bragg, North Carolina, designated a Regular Army division on 15 November 1948. The 82nd was not sent to the Korean War, as both presidents Truman and Eisenhower chose to keep it in strategic reserve in the event of a Soviet ground attack anywhere in the world. Life in the 82nd in the 1950s and 1960s consisted of intensive training exercises in all environments and locations, including Panama, the Far East, and the continental United States.

==== Pentomic organization ====
In 1957, the division implemented the pentomic organization, officially Reorganization of the Airborne Division (ROTAD), to better prepare for tactical nuclear war in Europe. Five battle groups, each with a headquarters and service company, five rifle companies and a mortar battery, replaced the division's three regiments of three battalions each. The division's battle groups were:

- 1st Airborne Battle Group (ABG), 187th Infantry (reassigned from the 24th Infantry Division on 8 February 1959)^{(1)}
- 1st ABG, 325th Infantry
- 2nd ABG, 501st Infantry
- 1st ABG, 503d Infantry (reassigned from the 24th Infantry Division on 1 July 1958)^{(2)}
- 2nd ABG, 503rd Infantry (reassigned to the 25th Infantry Division on 24 June 1960)
- 1st ABG, 504th Infantry (reassigned to the 8th Infantry Division on 11 December 1958)
- 2nd ABG, 504th Infantry (assigned effective 9 May 1960)^{(1)}
- 1st ABG, 505th Infantry (reassigned to the 8th Infantry Division on 15 January 1959)

(1) 1st ABG, 504th Infantry and 1st ABG, 505th Infantry were reassigned to the 8th Infantry Division in central West Germany to provide airborne capability in Germany; in turn, 1–187th and 1-503d were reassigned from the 24th Infantry Division in southern Germany to the 82nd Airborne Division
(2) 2nd ABG, 503rd Infantry was reassigned to the 25th Infantry Division and stationed in Okinawa to provide airborne capability in the Pacific on 24 June 1960. This ABG was reassigned to the 173d Airborne Brigade on 26 March 1963.

- the Division Artillery consisted of:
  - Battery A, 319th Artillery
  - Battery B, 319th Artillery
  - Battery C, 319th Artillery (Battery C, 320th Artillery after 1960; C-319th accompanied the 2d ABG, 503d Infantry on its assignment to the 25th Infantry Division)
  - Battery D, 320th Artillery
  - Battery E, 320th Artillery
  - Battery B, 377th Artillery
- additional division elements consisted of:
  - 82nd Medical Company
  - 82nd Signal Battalion
  - 82nd Aviation Company
  - Troop A, 17th Cavalry
  - 307th Airborne Engineer Battalion
  - 407th Supply and Transportation Battalion (The 82nd Quartermaster Parachute Supply and Maintenance Company [activated 1 March 1945] was reorganized and redesignated as Company B, 407th S&T Battalion.)
  - 782nd Maintenance Battalion

The pentomic organization was unsuccessful. In 1964, the division reorganized into three brigades of three battalions, the Reorganization Objective Army Division (ROAD) organization.

==== Dominican Republic and Vietnam ====
In April 1965, the "All-Americans" invaded the Dominican Republic. Spearheaded by the 3rd Brigade, the 82nd deployed in Operation Power Pack.

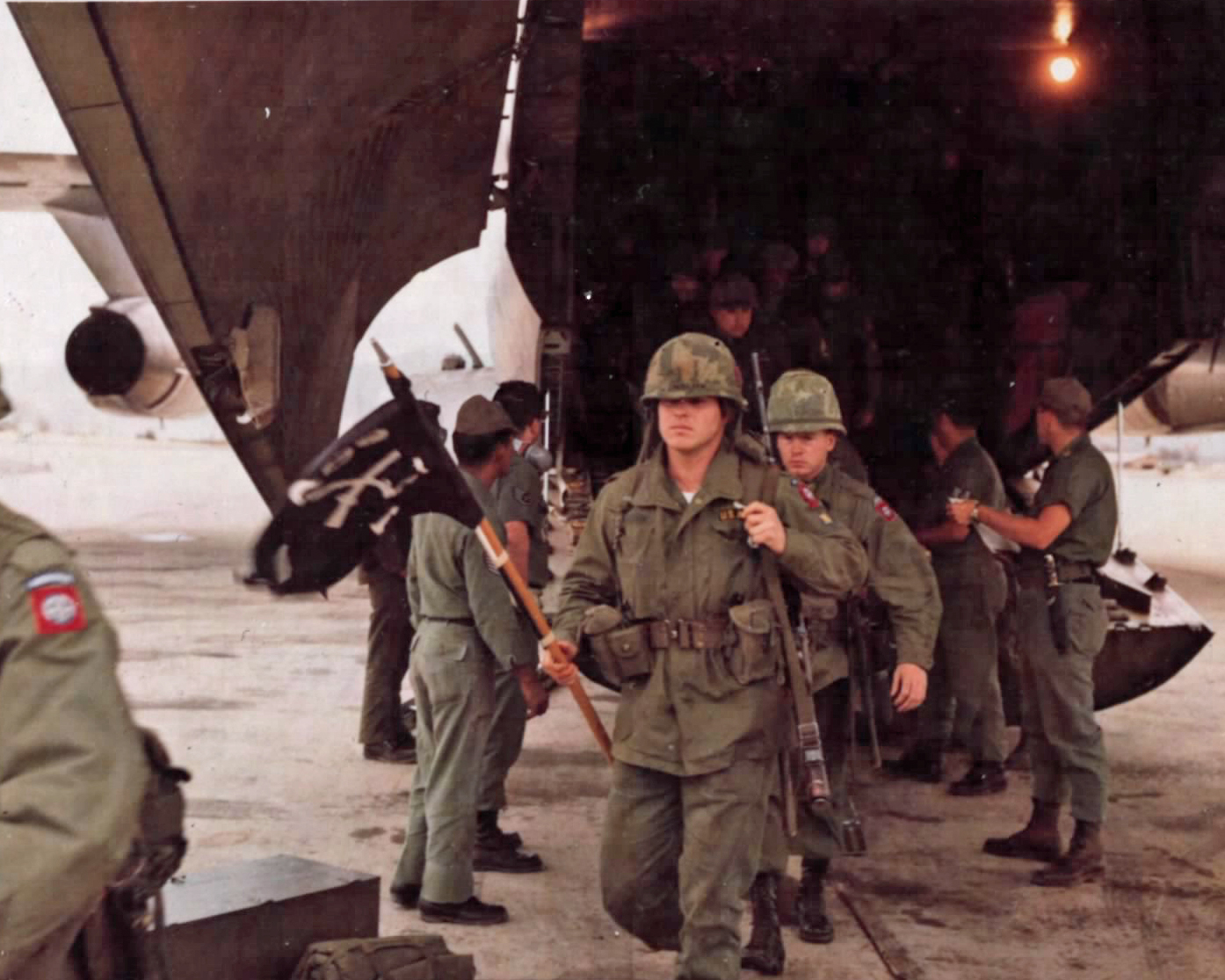
Deployment of the 82nd Airborne Division's 3rd Brigade to Chu Lai during the Tet Offensive, February 1968

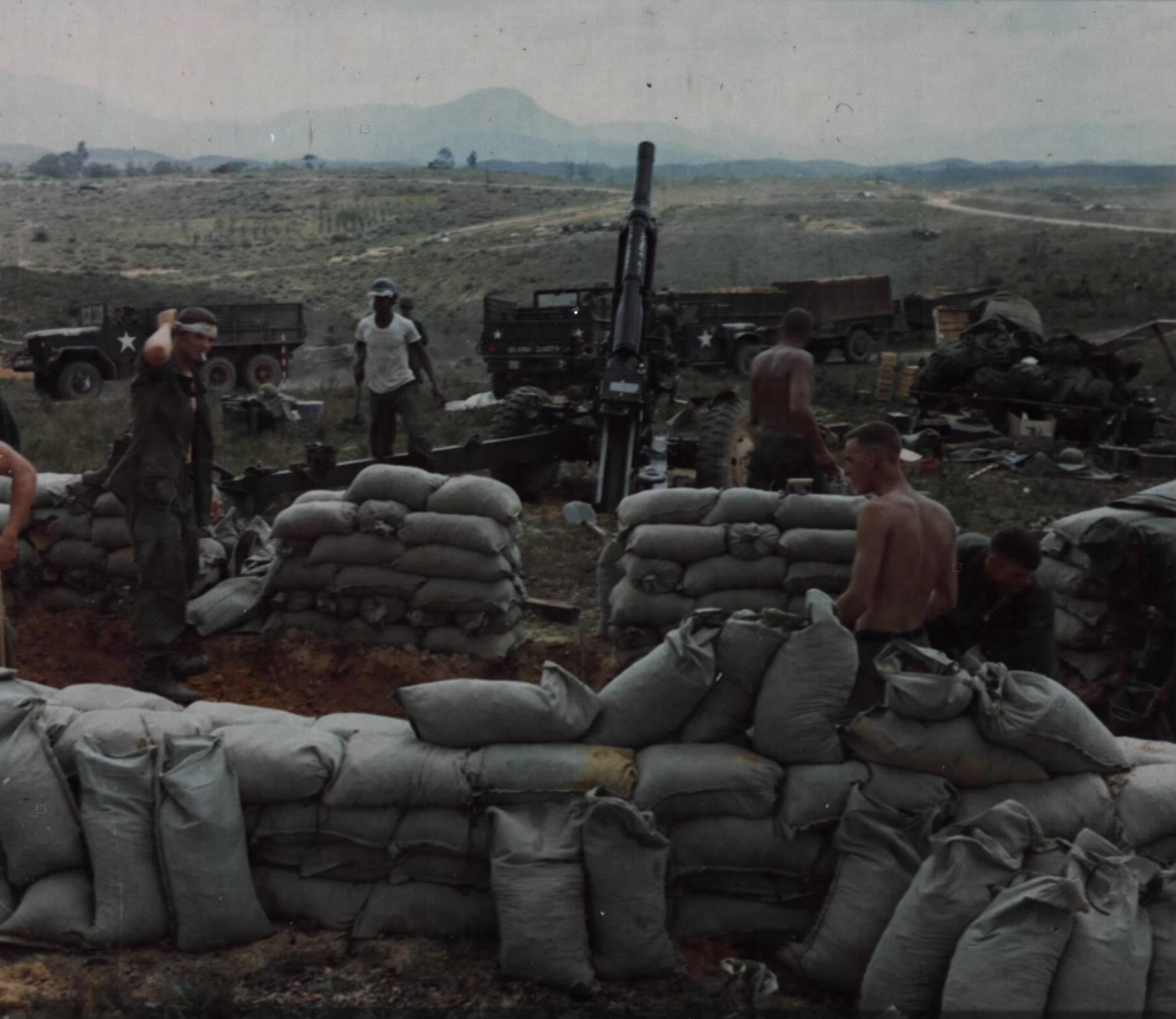
Members of the 3rd Brigade fill and stack sandbags around personnel bunker at Phu Bai Combat Base, 6 March 1968.

During the Tet Offensive, which swept across South Vietnam in January/February 1968, the 3rd Brigade was en route to Chu Lai within 24 hours of receiving its orders. The 3rd Brigade performed combat duties in the Huế – Phu Bai area of the I Corps sector. Later the brigade moved south to Saigon, and fought in the Mekong Delta, the Iron Triangle and along the Cambodian border, serving nearly 22 months.

While the 3rd Brigade was deployed, the division created a provisional 4th Brigade, consisting of 4th Battalion, 325th Infantry; 3d Battalion, 504th Infantry; and 3d Battalion, 505th Infantry. An additional unit, the 3d Battalion, 320th Artillery, was activated under Division Artillery to support the 4th Brigade.

The units assigned and attached to the 3d Brigade of the 82nd Airborne Division were as follows:

- Brigade Infantry:
  - 1st Battalion (Airborne), 505th Infantry
  - 2nd Battalion (Airborne), 505th Infantry
  - 1st Battalion (Airborne), 508th Infantry
- Brigade Artillery:
  - 2nd Battalion (Airborne), 321st Artillery (105mm)
- Brigade Aviation:
  - Company A, 82nd Aviation Battalion
- Brigade Reconnaissance:
  - Troop B, 1st Squadron (Armored), 17th Cavalry
  - Company O (Ranger), 75th Infantry
- Brigade Support:
  - 82nd Support Battalion
  - 58th Signal Company
  - Company C, 307th Engineer Battalion (Airborne)
  - 408th Army Security Agency Detachment
  - 52nd Chemical Detachment
  - 518th Military Intelligence Detachment
  - 307th Medical (Airborne) Headquarters and Alpha Company

The deployment of the 3rd Brigade took place with significant problems and controversy. In The Rise and Fall of an American Army: US Ground Forces in Vietnam, 1965–1973, author Shelby L. Stanton describes how, other than the 82nd, only two under-strength Marine and four skeletonized Army divisions were left stateside by the beginning of 1968. The U.S. Military Assistance Command, Vietnam (MACV), desperate for additional manpower, wanted the division to deploy to Vietnam, and the Department of the Army, wishing to retain its "sole readily deployable strategic reserve, the last real vestige of actual Army divisional combat potency in the United States left to the Pentagon," compromised by sending the 3d Brigade. As Stanton wrote:

The division had been so rushed to get this brigade to the battlefront that it ignored individual deployment criteria. Paratroopers who had just returned from Vietnam now found themselves suddenly going back. The howl of soldier complaints was so vehement that the Department of the Army was soon forced to give each trooper who had deployed to Vietnam with the 3d Brigade the option of returning to Fort Bragg or remaining with the unit. To compensate for the abrupt departures from home for those who elected to stay with the unit, the Army authorized a month leave at the soldiers' own expense or a two-week leave with government aircraft provided for special flights back to North Carolina. Of the 3,650 paratroopers who had deployed from Fort Bragg, 2,513 elected to return to the United States at once. MACV had no paratroopers to replace them, and overnight the brigade was transformed into a separate light infantry brigade, airborne in name only.

==== Urban riots in 1967–68 ====
===== 1967 Detroit riot =====
On 24 July 1967, shortly before midnight, President Lyndon B. Johnson ordered the US military to occupy Detroit. At 1:10 a.m., 4,700 paratroopers of the 82nd and 101st Airborne Divisions, under the command of Lieutenant General John L. Throckmorton, arrived in Detroit and began working in the streets, coordinating refuse removal, tracing persons who had disappeared in the confusion, and carrying out routine military functions, such as the establishment of mobile patrols, guard posts, and roadblocks.

Rioting peaked in high intensity. The 82nd worked alongside the 101st to secure east of Woodward, while the National Guard took land west of Woodward. "Incidents" began to decline as paratroopers constantly patrolled the perimeter with M16 rifles, M60 machine guns, and M48 tanks, while the police began making arrests on those violating curfew regulations or who were caught looting. On 27 July, with a sense of normalcy returned to the city, in part due to the presence of Army and National Guard troops, and the riot was officially declared over. The Army began to scale down to return to their normal duties, relinquishing control to local authorities.

Although Army paratroopers exercised some restraint on firepower due to being racially integrated, as well as their combat experience in Vietnam (as opposed to the mainly white and inexperienced National Guard troops), the 82nd was directly responsible for at least one death. On 29 July, two days after the riot officially ended, 82nd Captain Randolph Smith fatally shot Ernest Roquemore, a 19-year-old black man carrying a transistor radio. Three other individuals were injured by shotgun fire from police in the same incident. The Army and Detroit Police were on a joint patrol to recover looted items within the vicinity.

On 30 July, the 82nd and the 101st completely left Detroit and moved back to Selfridge for redeployment to their home stations, a process that continued gradually until 2 August.

===== 1968 riots in Washington, D.C., and Baltimore =====
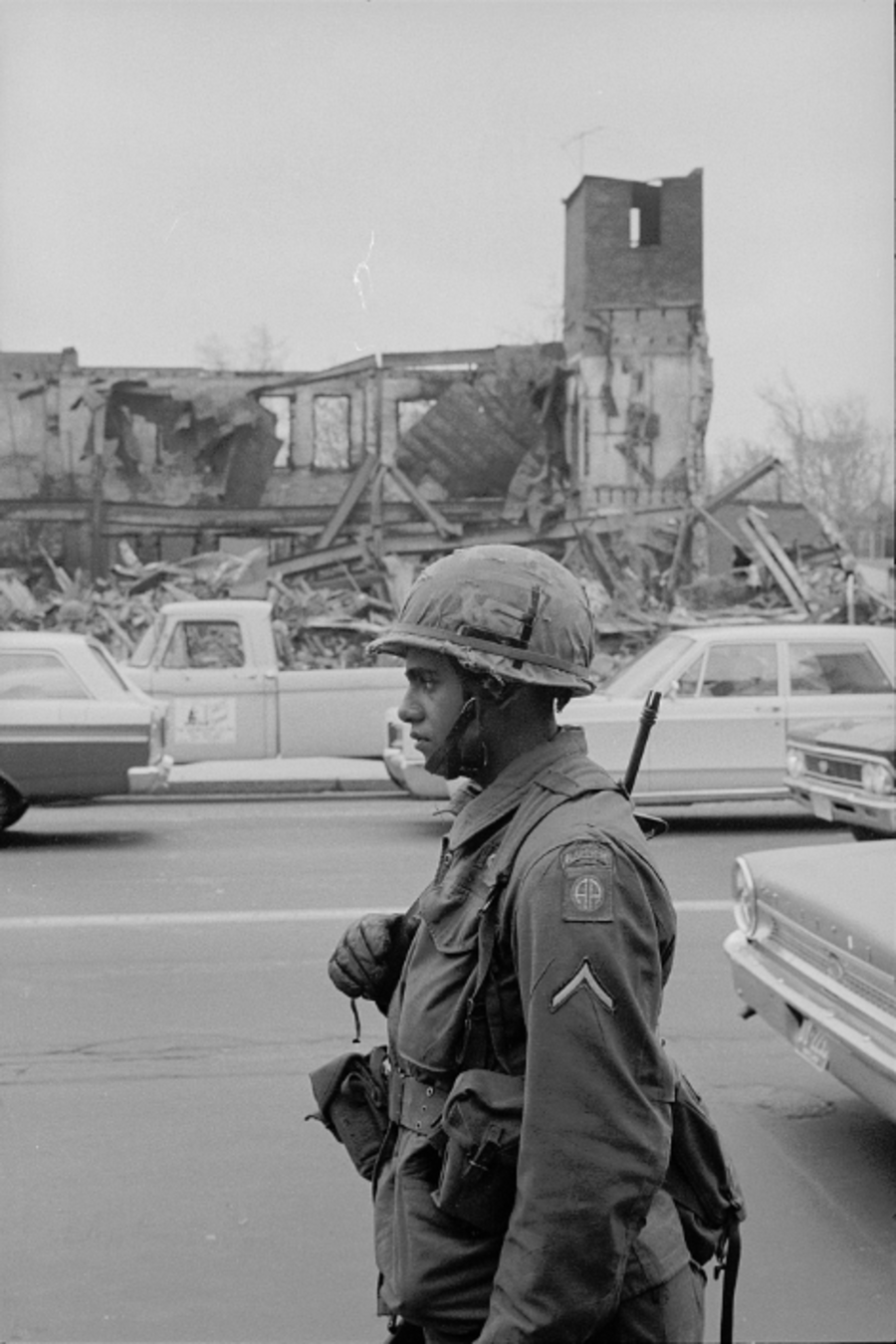
An 82nd paratrooper on guard duty near the passing motorists and the destroyed building on 8 April 1968, during the rioting in Washington, D.C.

The 82nd was called in to tackle civil disturbances in Washington, D.C., and Baltimore in the wake of the nationwide riots following the assassination of Martin Luther King Jr. on 4 April 1968. In Washington, D.C., the first of 21 aircraft carrying the 1st Brigade Combat Team of the 82nd landed at Andrews Air Force Base on 6 April, with the 82nd's 2nd Brigade Combat Team joining up later. More than 2,000 82nd paratroopers were among the 11,850 federal troops to assist the Metropolitan Police Department of the District of Columbia and the D.C. Army National Guard in Washington.

By then, the rioting had largely ended, but isolated looting and arson continued for a few more days. On 8 April, when D.C. was considered pacified, the 1st Brigade was later moved to Baltimore in assisting the Maryland National Guard and the Baltimore Police Department because of the ongoing city's disorder there, leaving the 2nd Brigade the only 82nd unit in Washington.

The 82nd brigades in D.C. and Baltimore worked with other federal, state, and local forces in maintaining order, detaining looters, clearing any signs of trouble, assisting crews clearing debris from the main traffic arteries, and helping sanitation, food store, and public utility employees to restore essential services within devastated areas. On 12 April, orders were issued for federal troops and National Guardsmen stationed in both cities to return to their home stations. The 1st Brigade was among the federal forces that left Baltimore by midnight the same day and three days later, the 2nd Brigade went into an assembly area at Bolling Air Force Base, where they eventually departed back to Fort Bragg sometime later.

==== Post-Vietnam Operations ====
From 1969 into the 1970s, the 82nd deployed paratroopers to South Korea and Vietnam on more than 180DBT (Days Bad Time) for exercises in potential future battlegrounds. The division received three alerts. One was for Black September in 1970. Paratroopers were on their way to Amman, Jordan when the mission was aborted. In May 1971, they helped national guard and Washington DC police to round up and arrest protestors.

During the Wounded Knee uprising in 1973, the 82nd was brought to the Pine Ridge reservation under the direction of plain-clothed Colonel Volney Warner in the field and, from the Pentagon, General Alexander Haig.

In the fall of 1973, war in the Middle East brought the 82nd to full alert. In August 1980, the 1st Battalion (Airborne), 504th Infantry was alerted and deployed to conduct civil disturbance duty at Fort Indiantown Gap, Pennsylvania, during the Cuban refugee internment. President Gerald Ford put the unit on high alert in case the administration decided to intervene in the Boston desegregation busing crisis.

In May 1978, the division was alerted to a possible drop into Zaire. In November 1979, the division was alerted for a possible operation to rescue the American hostages in Iran. The division formed the nucleus of the newly created Rapid Deployment Forces (RDF), a mobile force at a permanently high state of readiness.

===== Invasion of Grenada =====
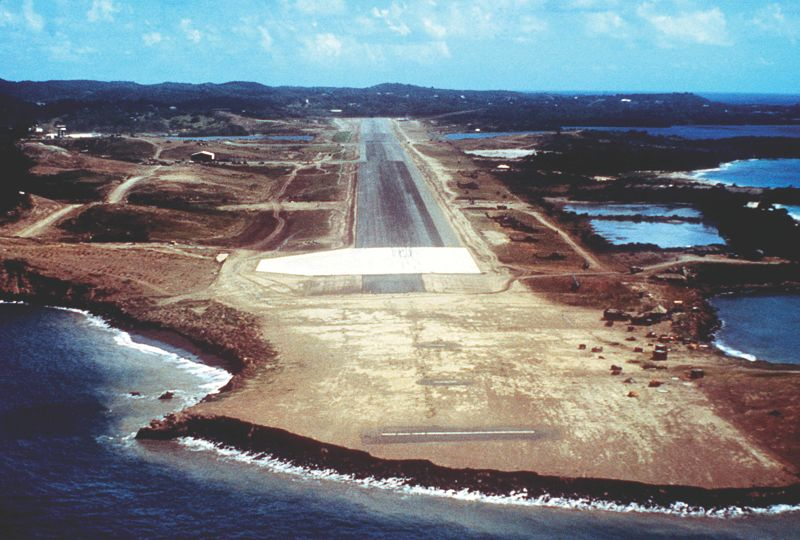
Southern Objective: Cuban-built Point Salinas Airport, Grenada, 1983

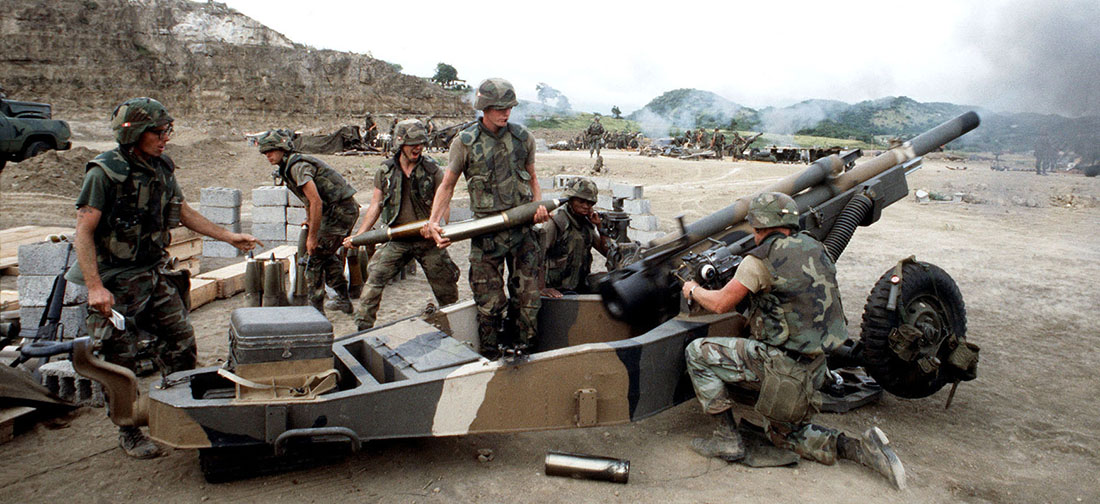
82nd Airborne Division artillerymen firing M102 howitzers during Operation Urgent Fury, November 1983

On 25 October 1983, elements of the 82nd conducted an Airland Operation to secure Point Salines Airport following an airborne assault by the 1st and 2nd Ranger Battalions who conducted the airfield seizure just hours prior. The first 82nd unit to deploy was a task force of the 2d and 3d Battalions (Airborne), 325th Infantry. On 26 October and 27, the 1st Battalion (Airborne), 505th Infantry, and the 1st and 2nd Battalions (Airborne), 508th Infantry, deployed to Grenada with support units. 2-505 deployed as well.

Military operations ended in early November (Note: that C/2-325 did not deploy due to being a newly formed COHORT unit, in its place B/2-505 deployed, landing at Point Salines. The 82nd expanded its missions from the airhead at Salines to weed out Cuban Revolutionary Armed Forces and Grenadan People's Revolutionary Army soldiers Each proceeding battalion pushed a single company forward with A/2-504 deploying only one company out of the entire brigade. The operation was flawed in several areas and identified areas needing attention to enhance the United States RDF doctrine.

Newly issued Battledress Uniforms (BDUs) were not designed for the tropical environment; communication between Army ground forces and Navy and Air Force aircraft lacked interoperability and even food and other logistic support to ground forces were hampered due to communication issues between the services. The operation proved the division's ability to act as a rapid deployment force. The first aircraft carrying troopers from the 2–325th touched down at Point Salines 17 hours after H-Hour notification.

In March 1988, a brigade task force made up of two battalions from the 504th Infantry and 3d Battalion (Airborne), 505th Infantry, conducted a parachute insertion and air/land operation into Honduras as part of Operation Golden Pheasant. The deployment was billed as a joint training exercise, but the paratroopers were ready to fight. The deployment caused the Sandinistas to withdraw to Nicaragua. Operation Golden Pheasant prepared the paratroopers for future combat in an increasingly unstable world.

===== Panama =====
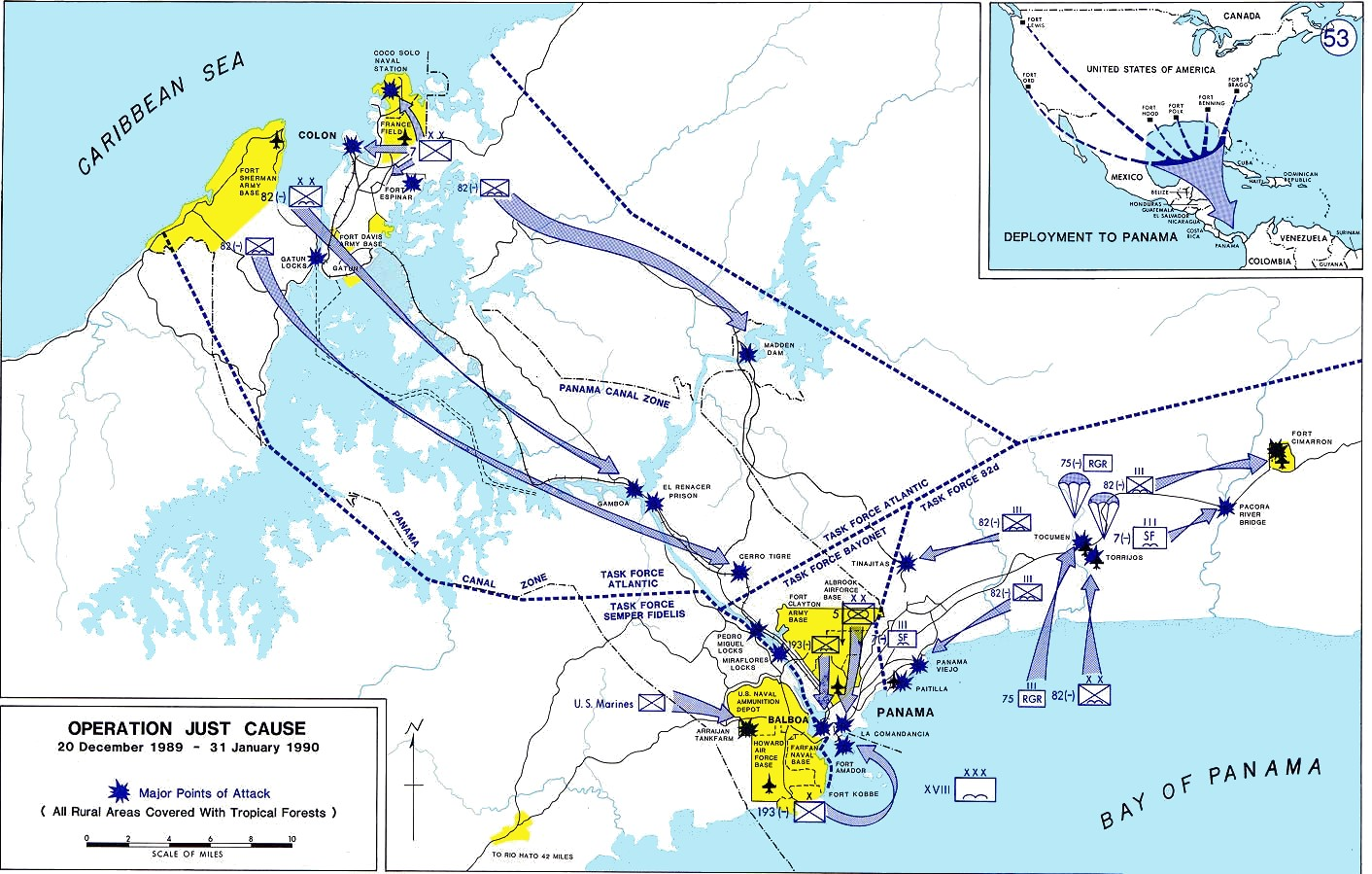
A tactical map of Operation Just Cause, showing major points of attack

On 20 December 1989, the "All-American", as part of the United States invasion of Panama, conducted their first combat jump since World War II onto Torrijos International Airport, Panama. The goal of the 1st Brigade task force, which was made up of the 1–504th and 2–504th INF as well as 4–325th INF and Company A, 3–505th INF, and 3–319th FAR, was to oust Manuel Noriega from power. They were joined on the ground by 3–504th INF, which was already in Panama.

The invasion was initiated with a night combat jump and airfield seizures. The 82nd conducted follow-on combat air assault missions in Panama City and the surrounding areas of the Gatun Locks. The operation continued with an assault of multiple strategic installations, such as the Punta Paitilla Airport in Panama City and a Panamanian Defense Forces (PDF) garrison and airfield at Rio Hato, where Noriega also maintained a residence. The attack on La Comandancia (PDF HQ) touched off several fires, one of which destroyed most of the adjoining and heavily populated El Chorrillo neighborhood in downtown Panama City.

The 82nd Airborne Division secured several other key objectives such as Madden Dam, El Ranacer Prison, Gatun Locks, Gamboa and Fort Cimarron. Overall, the operation involved 27,684 US troops and over 300 aircraft, including C-130 Hercules, AC-130 Spectre gunship, OA-37B Dragonfly observation, and attack aircraft, C-141 and C-5 strategic transports, F-117A Nighthawk stealth aircraft and AH-64 Apache attack helicopters. The invasion of Panama was the first combat deployment for the AH-64, the HMMWV, and the F-117A.

In the six years since the Invasion of Grenada, Operation Just Cause demonstrated how quickly the US Armed Forces could adapt and overcome the mistakes and equipment interoperability issues to conduct a quick and decisive victory. In all, the 82nd Airborne Division suffered six of the 23 fatalities of the operation. The paratroopers began redeployment to Fort Bragg on 12 January 1990. Operation Just Cause concluded on 31 January 1990, 42 days (D+42) after the invasion started.

==== Organization 1989 ====
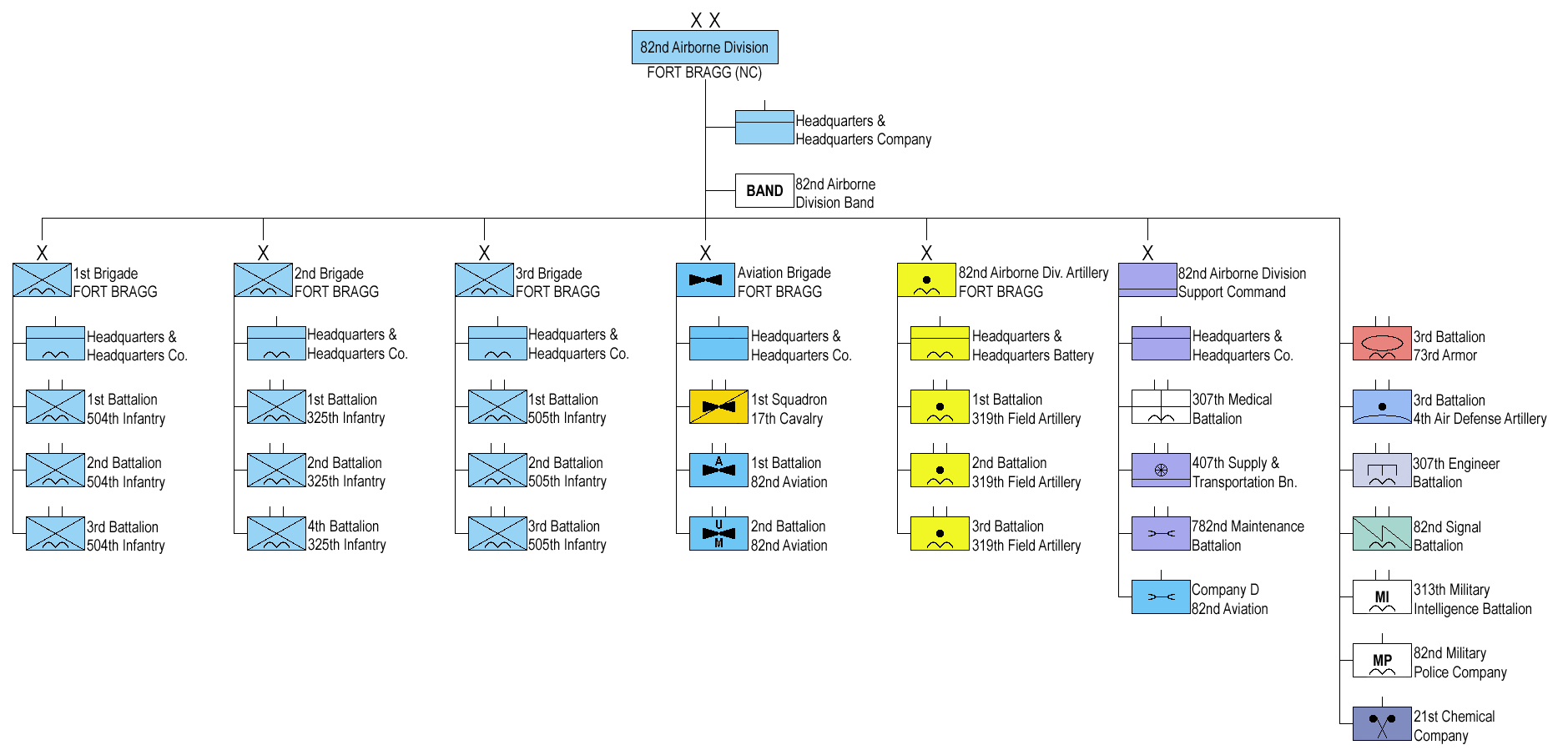
The organization of the 82nd Airborne Division in 1989 (click to enlarge)

At the end of the Cold War the division was organized as follows:

- 82nd Airborne Division, Fort Bragg, North Carolina
  - Headquarters & Headquarters Company
  - 1st Brigade
    - Headquarters & Headquarters Company
    - 1st Battalion, 504th Infantry
    - 2nd Battalion, 504th Infantry
    - 3rd Battalion, 504th Infantry
  - 2nd Brigade
    - Headquarters & Headquarters Company
    - 1st Battalion, 325th Infantry
    - 2nd Battalion, 325th Infantry
    - 4th Battalion, 325th Infantry
  - 3rd Brigade
    - Headquarters & Headquarters Company
    - 1st Battalion, 505th Infantry
    - 2nd Battalion, 505th Infantry
    - 3rd Battalion, 505th Infantry
  - Aviation Brigade
    - Headquarters & Headquarters Company
    - 1st Squadron, 17th Cavalry (Reconnaissance)
    - 1st Battalion, 82nd Aviation (Attack)
    - 2nd Battalion, 82nd Aviation (General Support)
  - Division Artillery
    - Headquarters & Headquarters Battery
    - 1st Battalion, 319th Field Artillery (18 × M102 105 mm towed howitzer)
    - 2nd Battalion, 319th Field Artillery (18 × M102 105 mm towed howitzer)
    - 3rd Battalion, 319th Field Artillery (18 × M102 105 mm towed howitzer)
  - Division Support Command
    - Headquarters & Headquarters Company
    - 307th Medical Battalion
    - 407th Supply & Transportation Battalion
    - 782nd Maintenance Battalion
    - Company D, 82nd Aviation (Aviation Intermediate Maintenance)
  - 3rd Battalion, 73rd Armor
  - 3rd Battalion, 4th Air Defense Artillery
  - 307th Engineer Battalion
  - 82nd Signal Battalion
  - 313th Military Intelligence Battalion
  - 82nd Military Police Company
  - 21st Chemical Company
  - 82nd Airborne Division Band

=== Post–Cold War ===
==== Gulf War ====
A map of ground operations during Operation Desert Storm, with the 82nd Airborne Division positioned at the left flank

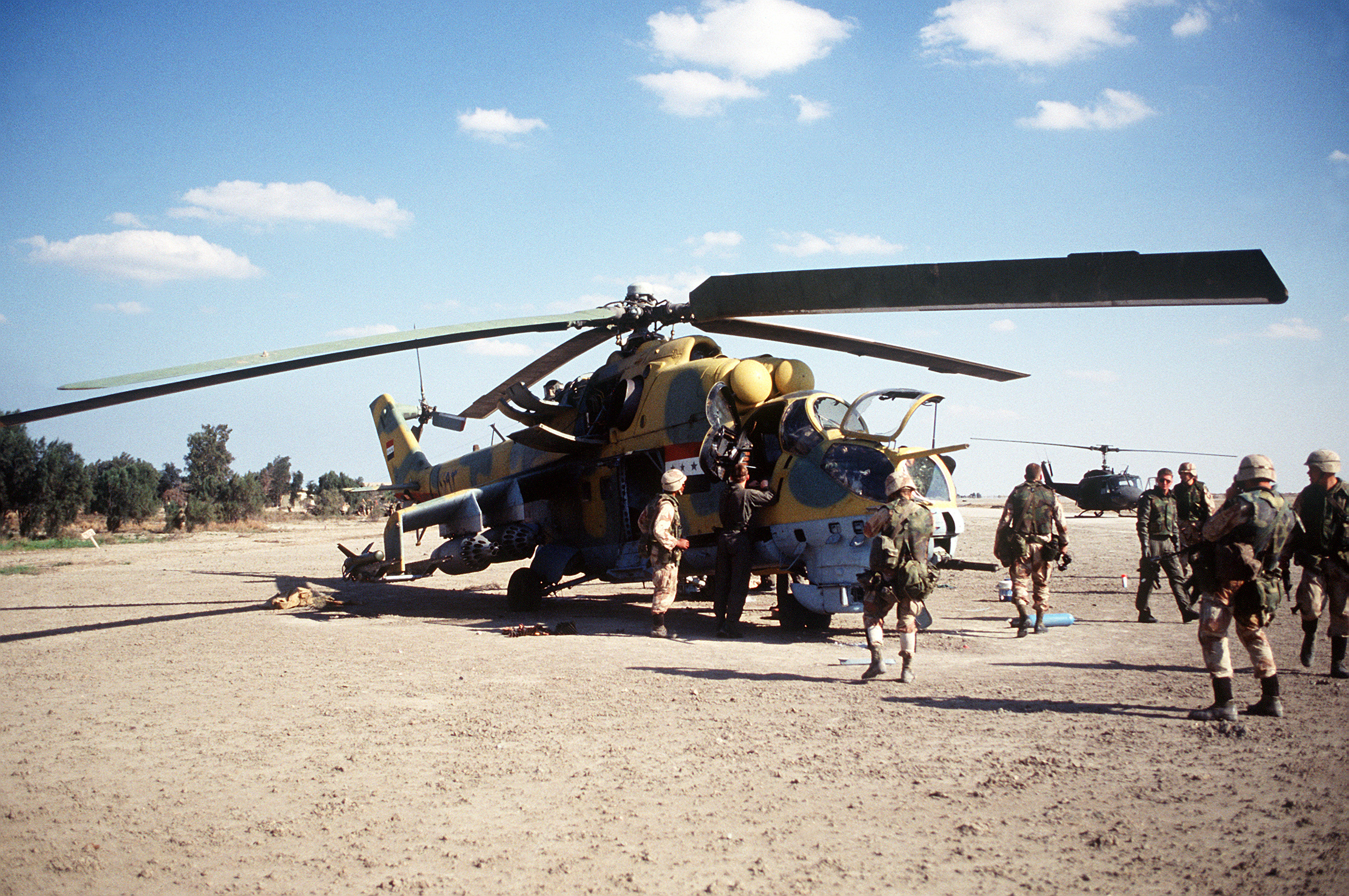
82nd Airborne Division soldiers inspect an abandoned Iraqi Mi-24 Hind-D, March 1991

Seven months later the paratroopers of the 82nd Airborne Division were again called to war. Four days after the Iraqi invasion of Kuwait on 2 August 1990, the 4th Battalion (Airborne), 325th Infantry was the Division Ready Force 1 (DRF-1) and the initial ground force invaded Iraq on the orders of President George Bush Sr. after his "Line in the sand" speech to Saddam Hussein part of the largest deployment of American troops since Vietnam as part of "Operation Desert Shield."

The 4–325th INF immediately deployed to Riyadh and Thummim, Saudi Arabia. Their role was to guard the royal family as part of the agreement with King Fahd to station troops in and around the kingdom. The DRF 2 and 3 (1–325 and 2-325 INF, respectively) began drawing the "line in the sand" near al Jubail by building defenses for possible retrograde operations. Soon after, the rest of the division followed. There, intensive intelligence operations began in anticipation of desert fighting against the heavily armored Iraqi Army.

On 16 January 1991, Operation Desert Storm began when American war planes attacked Iraqi targets. As the air war began, 2nd Brigade of the 82nd initially deployed near an airfield in the vicinity of the Saudi Aramco oil facilities outside Abqaiq, Saudi Arabia. While 1st Brigade and 3d Brigade consolidated at the Division HQ (CHAMPION Main) near Dhahran in Coinciding with the start of the air war, three National Guard Light-Medium Truck companies, the 253d (NJARNG), 1122d (AKARNG), and the 1058th (MAARNG) joined 2d Brigade of the 82nd.

In the coming weeks, primarily using the 5-Ton cargo trucks of these NG truck companies, the 1st Brigade moved north to "tap line road" in the vicinity of Rafha, Saudi Arabia. Eventually, these National Guard truck units effectively "motorized" the 325th Infantry, providing the troop ground transportation required for them to keep pace with the French Division Daguet during the invasion. Extensive ground operations began almost six weeks later.

The 2–325th INF was the division's spearhead for the ground war who took positions over the Iraqi border 24 hours in advance of U.S.-led forces at 8:00 am, 22 February 1991, on Objectives Tin Man and Rochambeau. On 23 February, 82nd Airborne Division paratroopers protected the XVIII Airborne Corps flank as fast-moving armor and mechanized units moved deep inside south-western Iraq. After the second day, the 1st Brigade moved forward to extend the Corps flank along with 3d Brigade. The 82nd drove deep into Iraq and captured thousands of Iraqi soldiers and tons of equipment, weapons, and ammunition. During that time, the 82nd's band and MP company processed 2,721 prisoners. After the liberation of Kuwait and the surrender of the Iraqi Army, the 82nd redeployed to Fort Bragg.

==== Hurricane Andrew ====
In August 1992, the 82nd Airborne deployed a task force to the hurricane-ravaged area of South Florida to provide humanitarian assistance following Hurricane Andrew. For more than 30 days, troopers provided food, shelter and medical attention to the Florida population as part of the US military Domestic Emergency Planning System. The 82nd was part of over 20,000 Army, Navy, Air Force, Marine, Coast Guard and an additional 6200 National Guard troops deployed for the disaster.

They also provided security and a sense of safety for the victims of the storm who were without power, doors, windows and in many cases roofs.

==== Haiti ====
On 16 September 1994, the 82nd Airborne Division joined Operation Uphold Democracy. The 82nd was scheduled to make combat parachute jumps into Pegasus Drop Zone and PAPIAP Drop Zone (Port-au-Prince Airport), to help oust Raoul Cédras and to restore Jean-Bertrand Aristide to the presidency. At the same time, former US president Jimmy Carter and former chairman of the Joint Chiefs of Staff Colin Powell were negotiating with Cédras to restore Aristide to power, the 82nd's first wave was in the air, with paratroopers waiting at Green Ramp to air-land in Haïti once the airfields there had been seized. When the Haitian military verified from sources outside Pope Air Force Base that the 82nd was on the way, Cédras stepped down, averting the invasion.

Former vice president Al Gore later travelled to Fort Bragg to personally thank the paratroopers of the 82nd for their actions, noting in a speech on 19 September 1994, that the 82nd's reputation was enough to change Cédras' mind:

But it did get a little close there for a while. As you may know, there were 61 planes in the air headed toward Haïti at the time they finally agreed. And at one point General Biamby came in and told General Cédras that he had just gotten word on his telephone that the airplanes had taken off from Pope Air Force Base, with soldiers from Fort Bragg, and that both disconcerted them and caused them to be suspicious of the intent of the negotiations, but it also created a situation where immediately after that, the key points they had been refusing to agree to were agreed to, a date certain, other matters that I won't go into in detail here.

==== Operations Safe Haven and Safe Passage ====
On 12 December 1994, the 2nd Battalion (Airborne), 505th Infantry, with the 2nd Platoon of Company C, 307th Engineer Battalion, deployed as part of Operations Safe Haven and Safe Passage. The battalion deployed from Fort Bragg "to restore order" against what American officials termed "Cuban refugees" who had attacked and injured a number of Air Force personnel and one marine while protesting their detainment at Empire Range along the Panama Canal. The battalion participated in the safeguarding of the Cuban refugees, a camp cordon and reorganization, and the active patrolling in and around the refugee camps in and around the Panamanian jungle along the Panama canal for two months.

General Engineering support in the area of camp establishment/improvement operations was provided by the Sappers of the habitually associated Task Force Panther Engineer platoon, 2/C-307th. Task Force Panther was commanded by LTC Lloyd J. Austin III, who was later the first African American General to commander of US Central Command and US Secretary of Defense. This support included the planning of camp power requirements, pouring of 78 concrete pads, three-foot bridges, a set of "mock doors" for airborne pre-jump training, and a system of decks for the muddy camp. During the deployment, the paratroopers experienced a 92 °F (33 °C) Christmas Day. They returned to Fort Bragg on 14 February 1995.

==== Bosnia and Herzegovina ====
Battalions of the 82nd prepared for a possible parachute jump to support elements of the 1st Armored Division which had been ordered to Bosnia-Herzegovina as part of Operation Joint Endeavor. Only after engineers of the 1st Armored Division bridged the Sava River on 31 December 1995 without hostilities did the 82nd begin to draw down against plans for a possible airborne operation there. The 82nd's 49th Public Affairs Detachment was deployed in support of the 1st Armored Division and air-landed in Tuzla with the 1AD TAC CP and began PA operations to include establishing the first communications in print and radio and covering the crossing of the Sava River by the main forces.

==== Centrazbat '97 ====
In September 1997, the 82nd traveled to Kazakhstan and Uzbekistan for CENTRAZBAT '97. Paratroopers from Ft. Bragg, NC flew 8,000 miles on US Air Force C-17s and jumped into an airfield in Shimkent, Kazakhstan. Forty soldiers from the three republics joined 500 paratroopers on the exercise-opening jump. Marine Gen. John Sheehan, then-commander in chief of the Atlantic Command, was first out of the aircraft. The 82nd joined units from Kyrgyzstan, Turkey, and Russia in the two-week-long NATO training mission. Members of the international press and local reporters from WRAL-TV and the Fayetteville Observer were embedded with the 82nd Airborne.

==== Kosovo ====
In March 1999, the TF 2–505th INF deployed to Albania and forward-deployed along the Albania/Kosovo border in support of Operation Allied Force, NATO's bombing campaign against Serbian forces in the former Yugoslav Republic. In September 1999, TF 3–504th INF deployed in support of Operation Joint Guardian, replacing TF 2–505th INF. TF 3–504th INF was replaced in March 2000 by elements of the 101st Airborne Division. On 1 October 1999, the 1–508th ABCT (SETAF) made a combat jump in "Operation Rapid Guardian": 500-foot altitude jump near Pristina.

=== Twenty-first century ===
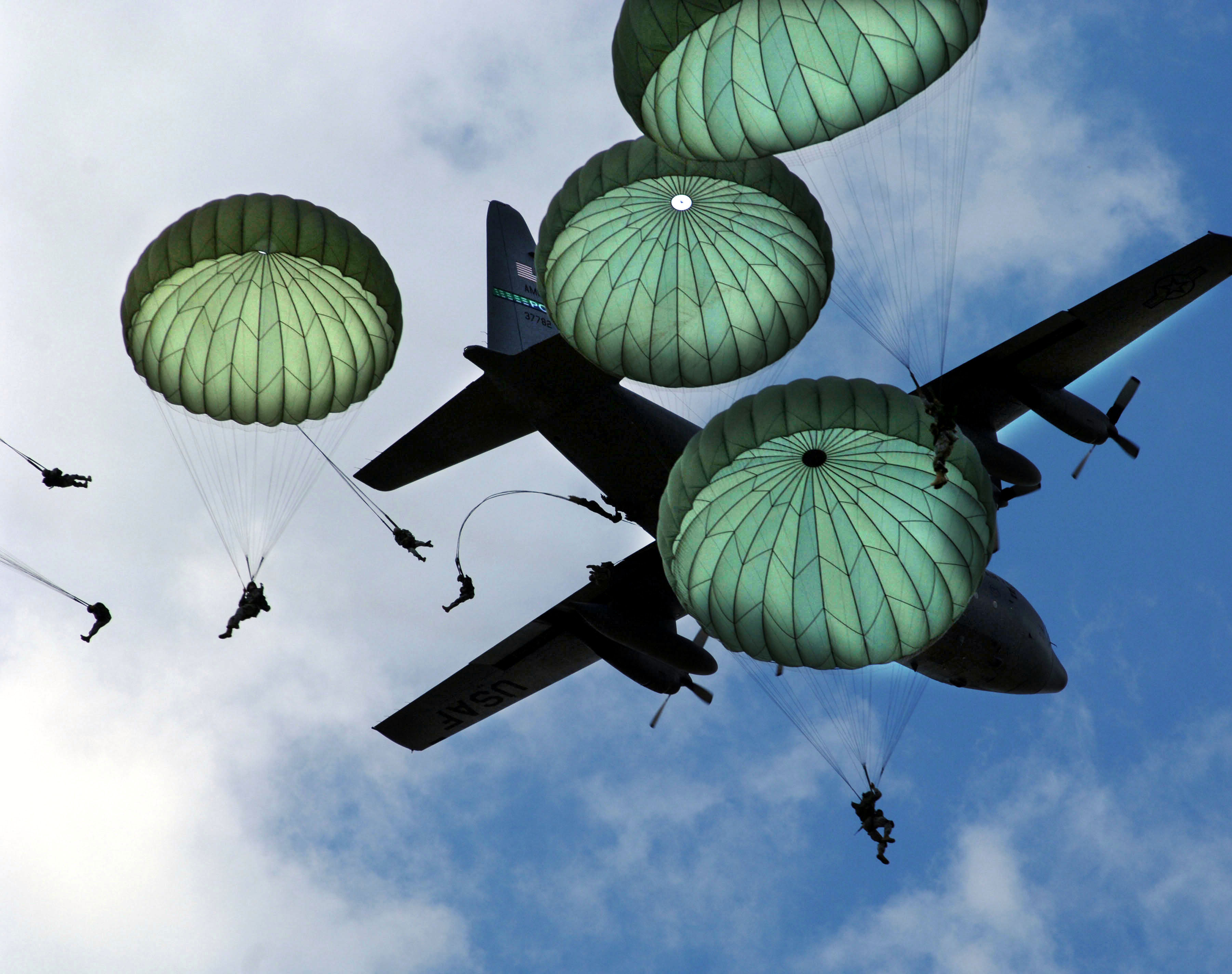
Paratroopers of the division perform a mass jump during the 2006 Joint Service Open House at Andrews Air Force Base, May 2006.

==== Invasion of Afghanistan ====
After the 11 September attacks against the United States, Washington launched the Global War on Terrorism (GWOT). The 82nd Airborne Division was deployed to Afghanistan as part of Operation Enduring Freedom within the area of responsibility of the Central Command (CENTCOM), with a Task Force (TF). In June 2002, the division's Task Force Panther, made up of elements from the 505th Parachute Infantry Regiment (505th PIR) and other divisional units, was deployed in combat. In January 2003, this force was replaced by Task Force Devil, composed of the 504th PIR and other divisional units.

- TF Panther
  - HQ 3d Brigade;
  - 1–504th INF;
  - 1–505th INF; 3–505th INF;
  - 1–319th FA.
- TF Devil
  - HQ 1st Brigade;
  - 2–504th INF;
  - 3–504th INF;
  - 2–505th INF;
  - 3–319th FA.

==== Invasion of Iraq ====
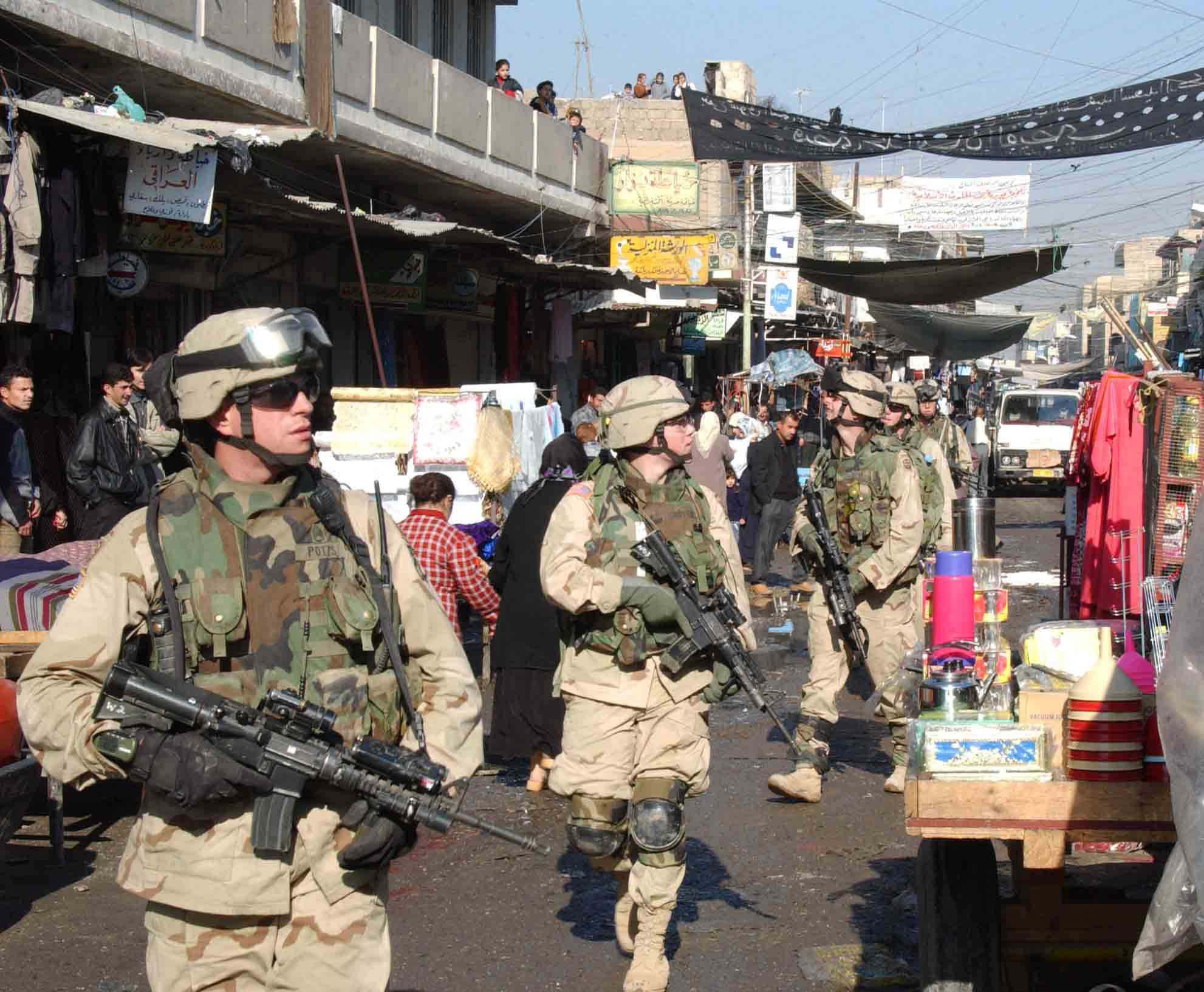
US paratroopers from the 82nd Airborne Division patrol the streets of the Al Sudeek district of Mosul, Iraq, in January 2005.

In March 2003, 2–325 of the 2nd BCT was attached to the 75th Ranger Regiment as part of a special operations task force to conduct a parachute assault to seize Saddam International Airport, part of Operation Iraqi Freedom. On 21 March 2003, Company D, 2-325 crossed the Saudi Arabia–Iraq border as part of Task Force Hunter to escort HIMARS artillery systems to destroy Iraqi artillery batteries in the western Iraqi desert.

Upon cancellation of the parachute assault to seize the airport, the battalion returned to its parent 2nd Brigade at Talil Airfield near An Nasariyah, Iraq. The 2nd Brigade then conducted operations in Samawah, Fallujah, and Baghdad. The brigade returned to the United States by the end of February 2004.

The early days of the 82nd Airborne's participation in the deployment were chronicled by embedded journalist Karl Zinsmeister in his 2003 book Boots on the Ground: A Month with the 82nd Airborne in the Battle for Iraq.

In April 2003, according to Human Rights Watch, soldiers from a subordinate unit, the 1st battalion of the 325th Infantry, allegedly fired indiscriminately into a crowd of Iraqi civilians protesting their presence in the city of Fallujah, killing and wounding many civilians. The battalion suffered no casualties.

The 3rd Brigade deployed to Iraq in the summer, redeploying to the US in spring 2004. The 1st Brigade deployed in January 2004. The last units of the division left by the end of April 2004. The 2nd Brigade deployed on 7 December 2004 to support the free elections and returned on Easter Sunday in 2005. During this initial deployment, 36 soldiers from the division were killed and about 400 were wounded, out of about 12,000 deployed. On 21 July 2006, the 1st Battalion, 325th Infantry Regiment, along with a platoon from Battery A, 2nd Battalion, 319th Field Artillery Regiment and a troop from 1st Squadron, 73rd Cavalry Regiment deployed to Tikrit, Iraq, returning in December 2006.

===== Torture and abuse at Camp Mercury =====
In September 2005, a Human Rights Watch report alleged that residents of Fallujah called the 1st Battalion, 504th Infantry Regiment "the Murderous Maniacs," based on their treatment of Iraqis in detention. According to accounts of 82nd Airborne officers and NCOs, members of the battalion in 2003–2004 routinely used physical and mental torture as a means of intelligence gathering and for stress relief. According to the report, these battalion members estimated "...that about half of the detainees at Camp Mercury were released because they were not involved in the insurgency, but they left with the physical and mental scars of torture."

After reporting these abuses yet being ignored by his superiors for 17 months, a then-anonymous captain took his allegations to three senior Republican senators—Bill Frist, John McCain, and John Warner—before the Army was finally compelled to launch an investigation. It was only after his report to the senators that action was taken. A staffer for one of them later told TIME magazine that the captain's claims were "extremely credible." The 1st Battalion, 504th Infantry Regiment's torture and abuse of prisoners later inspired the passage of the Detainee Treatment Act, and the anonymous captain was later revealed to be Ian Fishback.

When Ian Fishback died in 2021, Senator Dick Durbin called Ian Fishback a military hero, saying:

Major Fishback's courageous letter shed light on the atrocities that were being committed—shamefully—in the name of our nation. ... After reports emerged from horrific abuses at Abu Ghraib in Iraq, I tried for a year and a half to pass legislation to make it clear that cruel, inhuman, and degrading treatment of detainees was illegal. Two military heroes, my former colleague Senator John McCain and Major Fishback, turned the tide in this effort.

==== Rapid deployment operations ====
===== Afghanistan =====
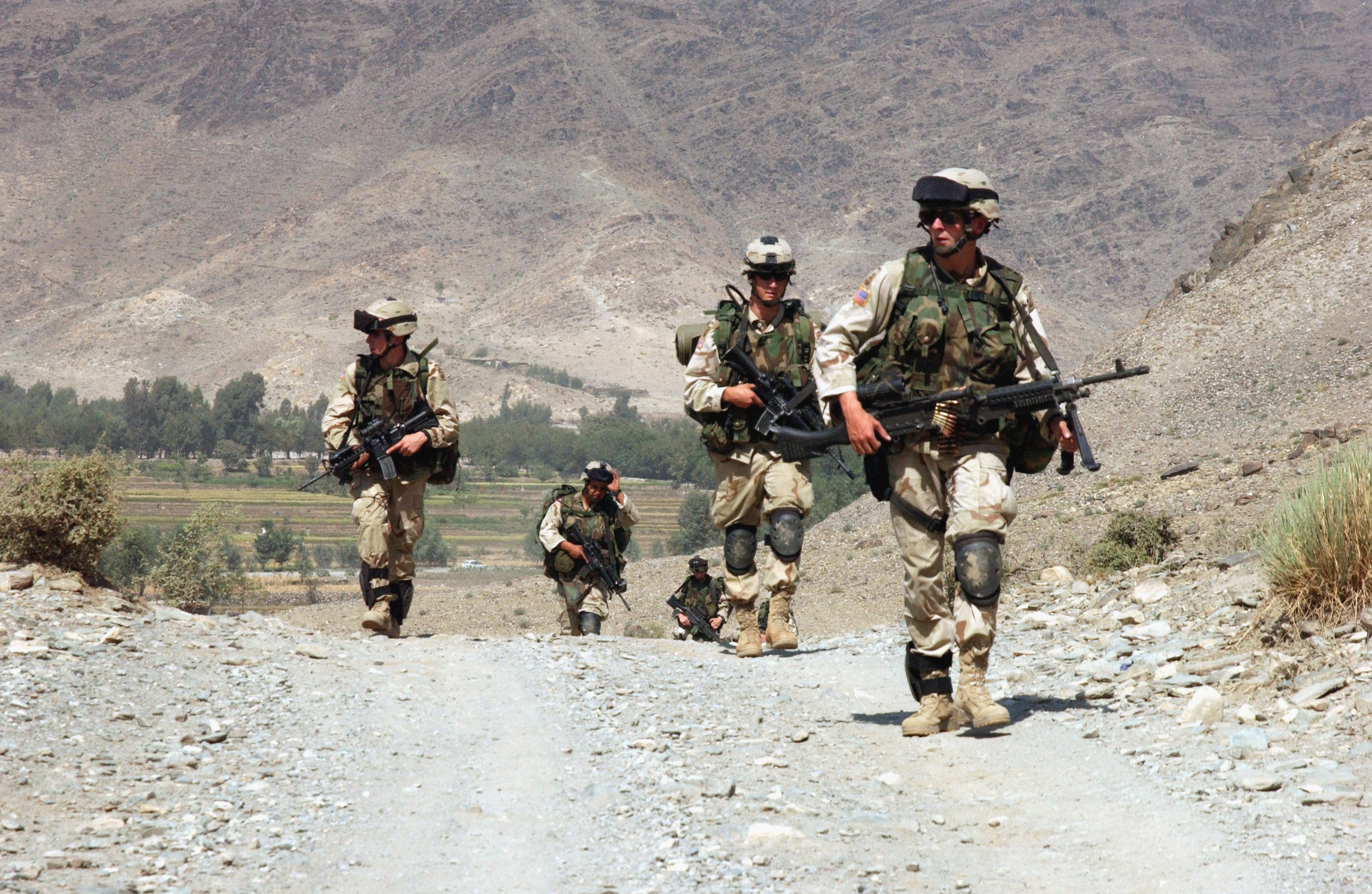
82nd Airborne Division paratroopers conducting a foot patrol in Nowabab, Afghanistan, October 2004

In late September 2004 the National Command Authority alerted TF 1–505th INF for an emergency deployment to Afghanistan in support of that October's elections.

===== Iraq =====
In December 2004, the task forces based on 2–325th AIR and 3–325th AIR were deployed to Iraq to provide security for the country's national elections in which more than eight million Iraqis voted.

==== Operation Enduring Freedom VI ====
The 1st Brigade of the 82nd deployed in April 2005 in support of OEF 6, and returned in April 2006. 1st Battalion, 325th Infantry Regiment deployed in support of OEF 6 from July through November 2005.

In March 2006, 3rd Battalion (General Support), 82nd Aviation was selected to augment a special operations task force using CH-47 Chinooks and UH-60 Black Hawks. The task force consisted of 75th Ranger Regiment, Special Forces, and 160th Special Operations Aviation Regiment (Airborne). 2007 February 18, seven soldiers from the task force died in a helicopter crash. The deployment would end a month later (March 2007).

In January 2007, then Maj. Gen. David M. Rodriguez deployed the division headquarters to Bagram Air Base, Afghanistan, accompanied by 4th BCT and the Aviation Brigade, as Commander, Combined Joint Task Force-82 (CJTF-82) and Regional Command – East for Operation Enduring Freedom VIII. The 3d BCT, 10th Mountain Division (Light Infantry) was extended for 120 days to increase the troop strength against the Taliban spring offensive. Extended to 15-month deployment, 4th BCT, which included 1–508th Infantry Regiment, 2–508th Infantry Regiment, and 4–73rd Cavalry Regiment, 2–321st Field Artillery, and 782nd Brigade Support Battalion, was commanded by then Col. Martin P. Schweitzer and remained in Khowst Province from January 2007 until April 2008.

The 2–508th IR worked to establish and maintain firebases in and around the Ghazni province while actively patrolling their operational area. The 1–508 PIR served in Regional Command-South. Working mostly out of Kandahar province as the theater tactical force, they mentored the Afghan National Security Force (ANSF), conducting combined operations with both ANSF and NATO partners in the Helmand Province. Supporting the division were the 36th Engineer Brigade, and the 43d Area Support Group.

==== Hurricane Katrina ====
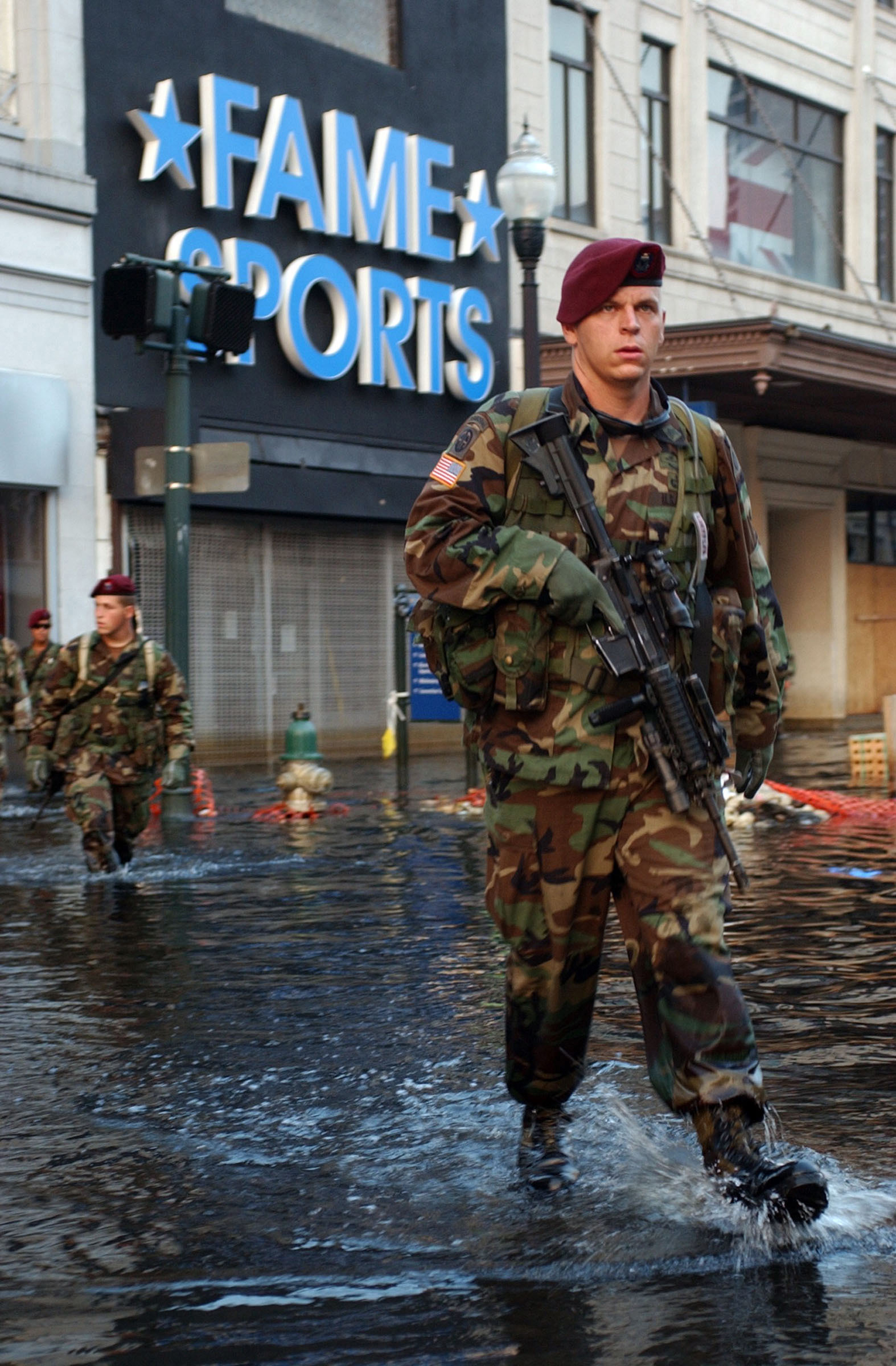
SGT Loeffler and his team, from Company C, 3rd Battalion, 505th Parachute Infantry Regiment, 82nd Airborne Division, wade through the flooded streets of the French Quarter in New Orleans, during a patrol in support of Joint Task Force Katrina

The 82nd Airborne's 3rd Brigade, 505th Infantry Regiment, and the division's 319th Field Artillery Regiment along with supporting units deployed to support search-and-rescue / security operations in New Orleans, Louisiana after the city was flooded by Hurricane Katrina in September 2005. About 5,000 paratroopers commanded by Major General William B. Caldwell IV, operated out of New Orleans International Airport.

==== Reorganization ====
In January 2006, the division began reorganizing from a division based organization to a brigade combat team-based organization. Activated elements include a 4th Brigade Combat Team, 82nd Airborne Division (1–508th INF, 2–508th INF, 4–73rd Cav (RSTA), 2–321st FA, 782nd BSB, and STB, 4th BCT) and the inactivation of the Division Artillery, 82nd Signal Battalion, 307th Engineer Battalion, and 313th Military Intelligence Battalion.

The 82nd Division Support Command (DISCOM) was redesignated as the 82nd Sustainment Brigade. A pathfinder unit was reactivated within the 82nd when the Long Range Surveillance Detachment of the inactivating 313th Military Intelligence Battalion was transferred to the 2d Battalion, 82nd Aviation Regiment and converted to a pathfinder role as the battalion's Company F.

==== Operation Iraqi Freedom, 2006–2009 ====
In December 2006, 2nd BCT deployed once again to Iraq in support of OIF. On 4 January 2007, 2nd Brigade deployed to northern Bagdad in the Sumer and Talbiyah district, returning 8 March 2008. On 4 June 2007, 1st Brigade deployed to Southern Iraq, returning 15 July 2008. Since the deployment began, the division has lost 37 paratroopers. Since 11 September 2001, the division has lost 20 paratroopers in Afghanistan and 101 paratroopers in Iraq.

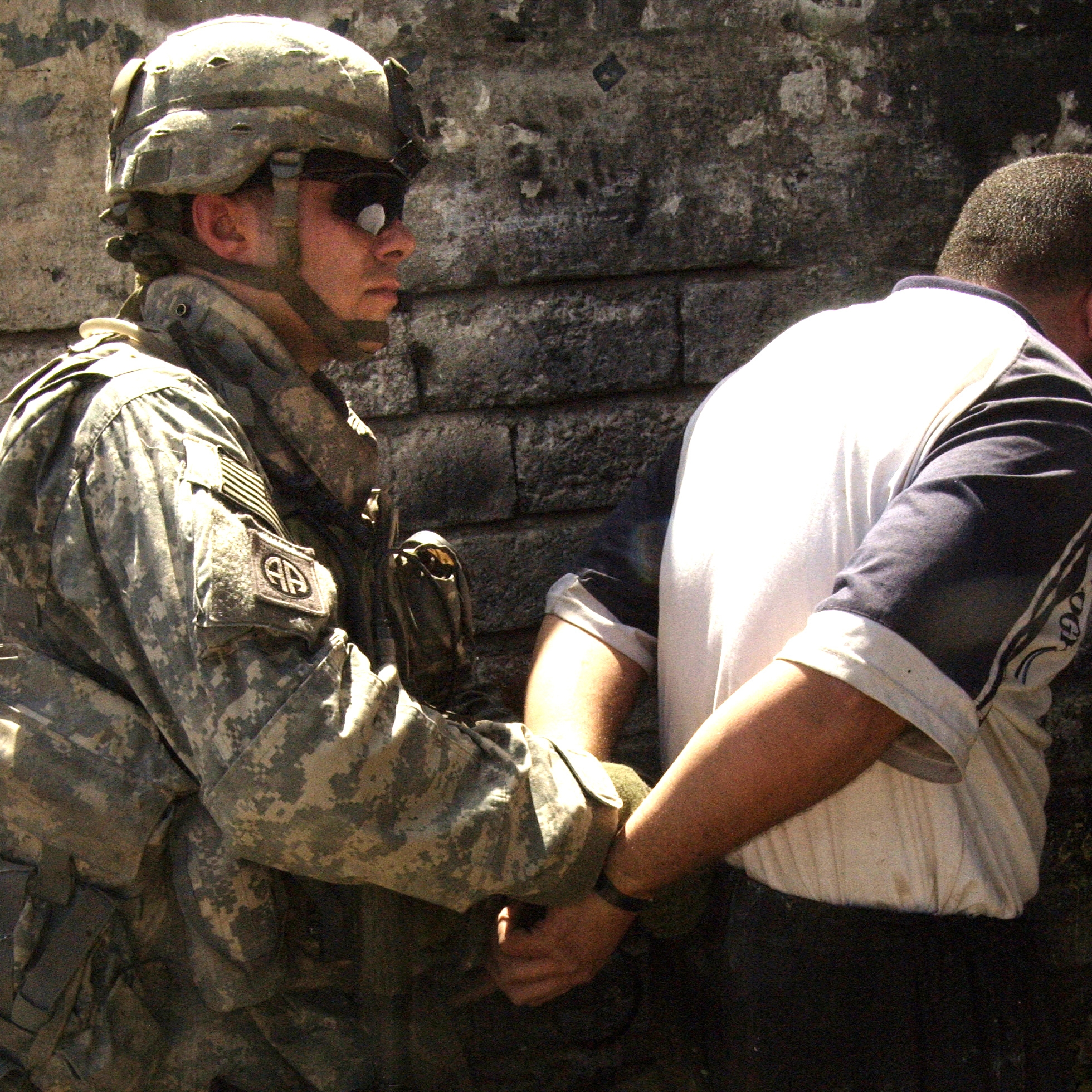
A US Paratrooper from the 82nd Airborne Division makes an arrest in June 2007, during the Iraq War.

==== Operation Enduring Freedom, 2007–2008 ====
In January 2007, then Maj. Gen. David M. Rodriguez deployed the division headquarters to Bagram, Afghanistan, accompanied by 4th BCT and the Aviation Brigade, as Commander, Combined Joint Task Force-82 (CJTF-82)and Regional Command – East for Operation Enduring Freedom VIII. The 3d BCT, 10th Mountain Division (Light Infantry) was extended for 120 days to increase the troop strength against the Taliban spring offensive.

Extended to 15-month deployment, 4th BCT, which included 1–508th Infantry Regiment, 2–508th Infantry Regiment, and 4–73rd Cavalry Regiment, 2–321st Field Artillery, and 782nd Brigade Support Battalion, was commanded by then Col. Martin P. Schweitzer and remained in Khowst Province from January 2007 until April 2008. The 2–508th IR worked to establish and maintain firebases in and around the Ghazni province while actively patrolling their operational area.

The 1–508 PIR served in Regional Command-South. Working mostly out of Kandahar province as the theater tactical force, they mentored the Afghan National Security Force (ANSF), conducting combined operations with both ANSF and NATO partners in the Helmand province. Supporting the division were the 36th Engineer Brigade, and the 43d Area Support Group.

==== Iraq 2008–2011 ====
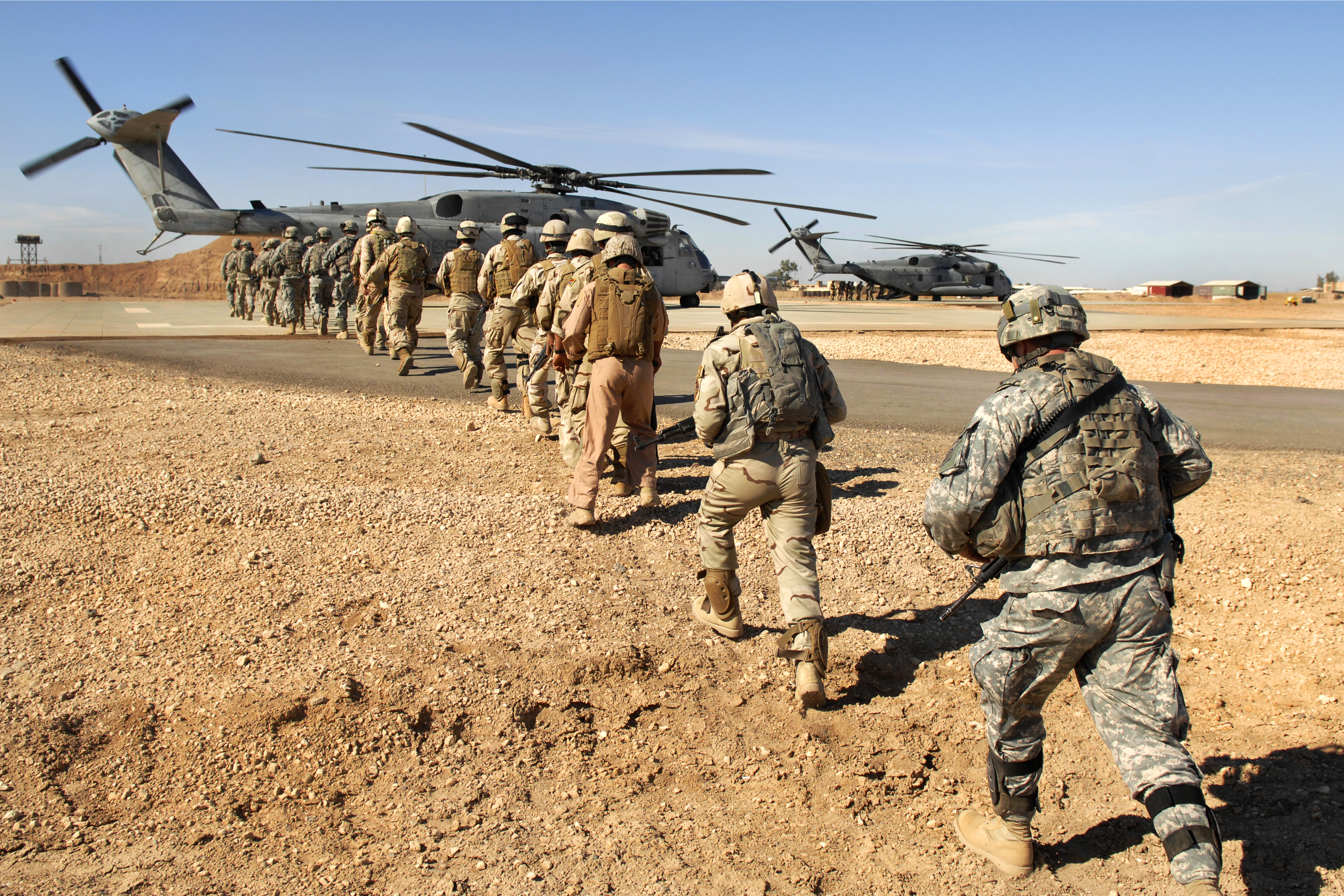
US Army and Iraqi army soldiers board a Marine Corps CH-53E Super Stallion helicopter in Camp Ramadi, Iraq, 2009.

In December 2008, the 3d BCT deployed to Baghdad, Iraq and redeployed to Ft. Bragg in November 2009. In August 2009, 1st BCT deployed once again to Iraq and redeployed late July 2010.

During the months of August and September 2009, 4th BCT deployed again to Afghanistan and returned in August 2010 having lost 38 soldiers.

In May 2011 1–505 (Task Force 1 Panther) deployed to Afghanistan in support of Operation Enduring Freedom. Dispersed throughout the country, 1st battalion was attached to various Special Operations elements. 1st battalion redeployed to Fort Bragg, NC in February 2012 having lost two paratroopers.

The 2d Brigade deployed to the Al Anbar Governorate in Iraq in May 2011, for the last time, as part of Operation New Dawn. Its mission was to advise, train and assist the Iraqi Armed Forces and Ministry of the Interior forces, as part of the withdrawal of United States Forces – Iraq. Elements of 2d Brigade were among the last US combat units to withdraw from Baghdad. The brigade suffered the loss of the last American service member in Iraq, SPC. David E. Hickman, on 14 November 2011. They were part of the long convoy of equipment and troops who exited Iraq into Kuwait as OIF came to an end.

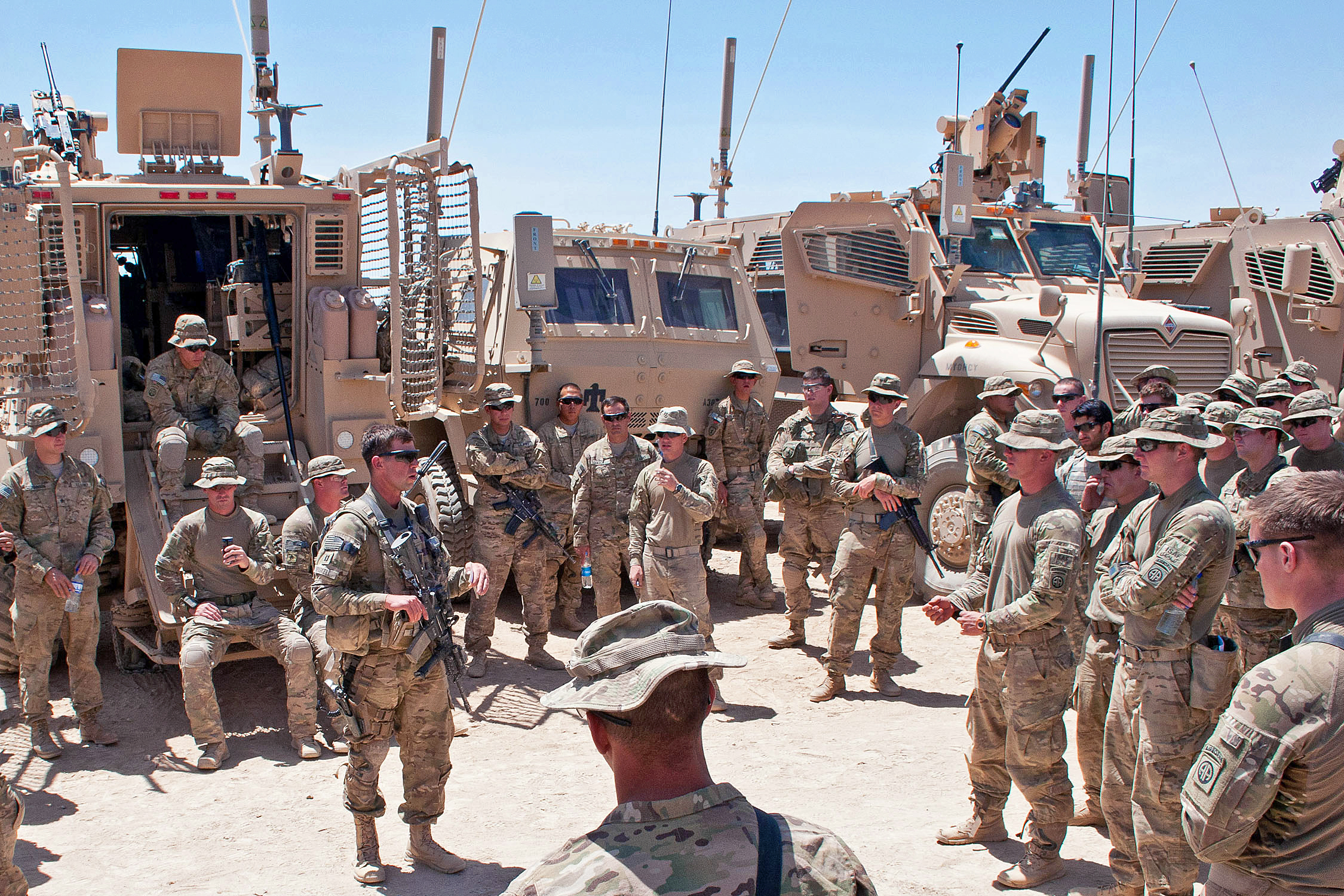
U.S. Army Captain briefs 82nd Airborne Division paratroopers before a patrol in Ghazni province, Afghanistan, August 2012

==== 2010 Haiti earthquake ====
As part of Operation Unified Response, the 2d BCT, on rotation as the division's Global Response Force, was alerted and deployed forces to Haiti later that same day for the mission to provide humanitarian assistance following the devastating earthquake in Haiti. Paratroopers distributed water and food during the 2010 Haiti earthquake relief.

Just two months following redeployment from Haiti in 2010, elements of 2d BCT (Red Falcons) deployed to Afghanistan in support of Operation Enduring Freedom to serve as trainers for the Afghan National Security Forces. In October 2011, the Division Headquarters returned to Afghanistan, where they relieved the 10th Mountain Division as the Headquarters of Regional Command-South.

In February 2012, 4th BCT deployed to Kandahar province. Taliban commander Mullah Dadullah, formed an overwhelming force in Kandahar. Zhari district in southern Kandahar is where Dadullah was recruiting a high number of jihadists. 4th BCT of the 82nd held the 5-month siege from March 2012 to the end of July, witnessing some of the most intense combat since the initial deployments since 2001, 4th BCT inflicted massive casualties among the Taliban. Performing with an almost perfect strategic plan, 4th BCT drove Dadullah and his men out of Kandahar to the Northeastern province of Kunar, where Dadullah was killed by airstrikes.

As of April 2012, the 1st BCT was deployed to Afghanistan, operating in Ghazni Province, Regional Command-East. The paratroopers took control of Ghazni from the Polish Armed Forces, allowing the Polish Task Force White Eagle (pl:Polski Kontyngent Wojskowy w Afganistanie) to consolidate around the provincial seat in northern Ghazni.

In June 2012, the 3rd Brigade Combat Team deployed as part of the Global Response Force (GRF) in support of heavy combat operations conducted by the 1st Infantry Division. The Brigade was spread across much of RC-East Afghanistan.

In December 2013, elements of the 4th Brigade deployed again to Afghanistan and they were joined by the 1st Brigade in spring 2014. Since 11 September 2001, the division has lost 106 paratroopers in Afghanistan and 139 paratroopers in Iraq.

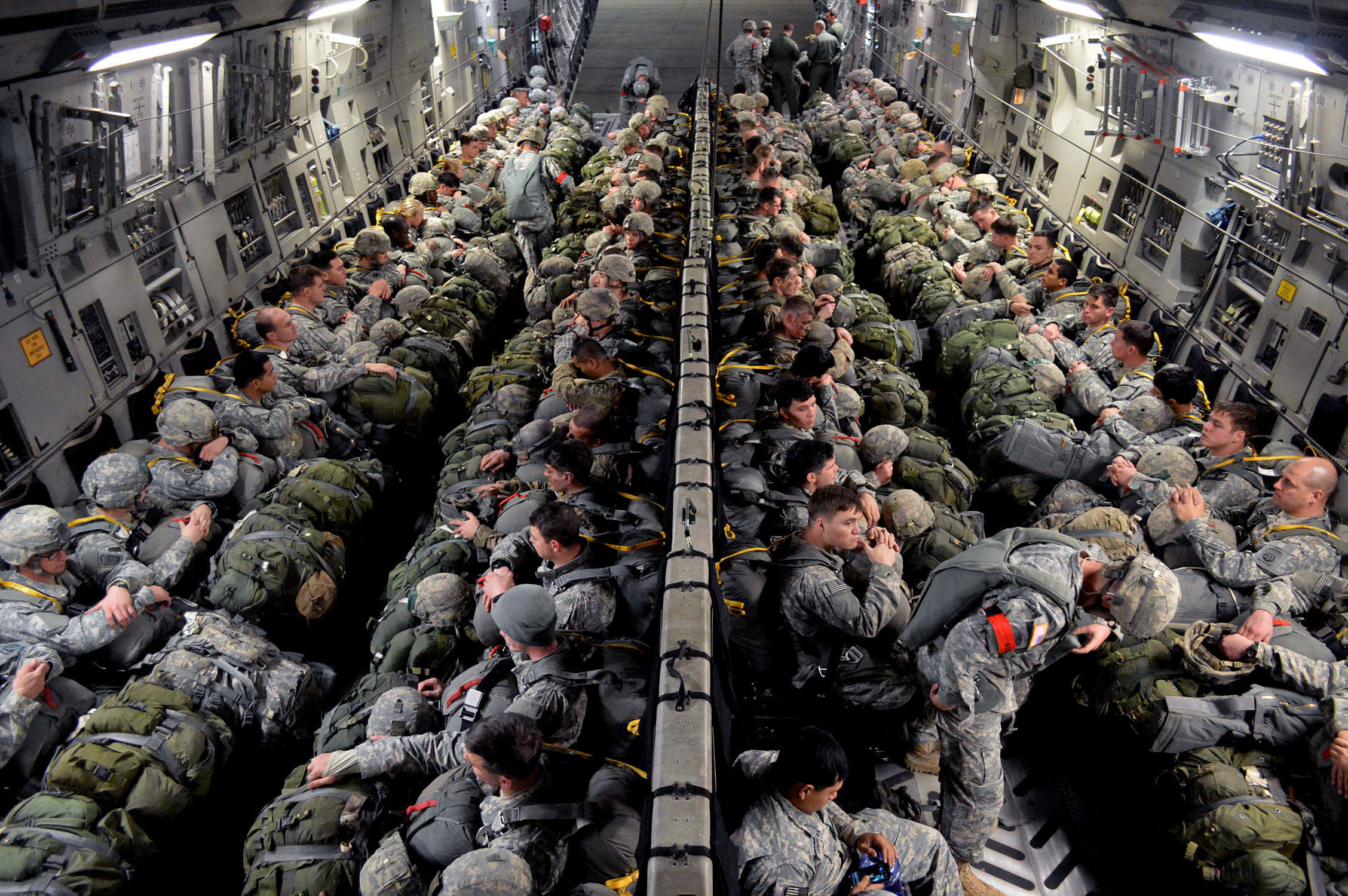
82nd Airborne Division paratroopers boarding a C-17 at Pope Army Airfield, January 2015

==== Operation Inherent Resolve ====
On 19 December 2014, Stars & Stripes, a daily military newspaper, announced 1,000 soldiers from the 82nd Airborne's 3rd Brigade Combat Team would deploy to Iraq to train, advise, and assist Iraq's Security Forces.

On 3 November 2016, it was reported that 1,700 soldiers from the 2d Brigade Combat Team will deploy to the US Central Command area of responsibility in Iraq, to take part in Operation Inherent Resolve. They will replace the 2d Brigade Combat Team, 101st Airborne Division and will advise and assist Iraqi Security Forces currently trying to retake Mosul from ISIS fighters.

On 27 March 2017, it was reported that 300 paratroopers from the 82nd Airborne's 2nd Brigade Combat Team will temporarily deploy to northern Iraq to provide additional advise-and-assist combating ISIS, particularly to speed up the offensive against ISIS in Mosul.

On 31 December 2019, approximately 750 soldiers from the 82nd Airborne's Immediate Response Force were authorized to be deployed to Iraq in response to events which saw the United States' embassy in the country stormed.

From the start of January 2017 to September 2017, the division suffered the loss of five paratroopers killed in action.

==== Syria intervention ====
It was confirmed in July 2020 that the 82nd Airborne Division did in fact have combat deployments in Syria.

==== Operation Freedom's Sentinel ====
The 1st BCT deployed to Afghanistan in support of Operation Freedom's Sentinel from June 2017 to March 2018. Two soldiers were killed in action when their convoy was purposefully hit by a vehicle filled with explosives.

The 3rd BCT deployed to Afghanistan in support of Operation Freedom's Sentinel from July 2019 to March 2020. In February 2020 soldiers from the 1st BCT, 10th Mountain Division were deployed to Afghanistan to replace the 3rd BCT as part of a unit rotation.

==== Iranian threat in Iraq ====
The 82nd Airborne was called to deploy in Iraq upon after rioting civilians outside of the US embassy in Baghdad, Iraq breached the outer gates of the Green Zone. On 1 January 2020, the first 750 troops began mobilizing to Kuwait and bases in the Baghdad area. On the direct orders of Donald Trump, Iranian general and Quds Force commander Qasem Soleimani was killed in a US airstrike at the Baghdad airport. Iranian influence on Iraqi militia groups was believed to play a part in the rioting at the US embassy. Actions by the Iranians and the US have increased tensions in the region not seen since before the invasion of Iraq in 2003. The 82nd airborne was among the first military units to be mobilized in response to this escalation and tensions. An additional 3,500 to 4,000 troops were ordered to deploy to Kuwait in response to Iranian threats in the region.

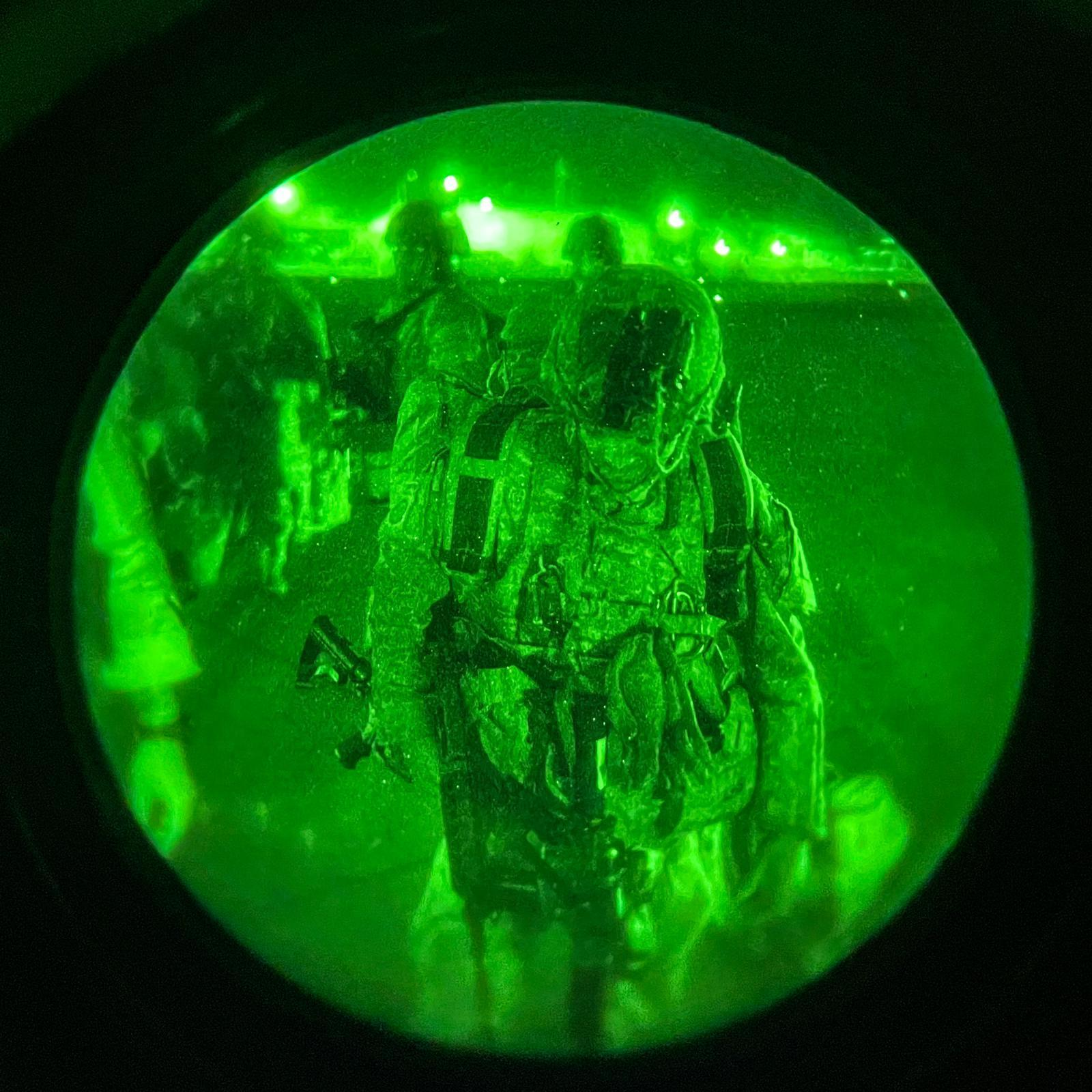
Paratroopers departing Hamid Karzai International Airport during the 2021 Kabul Airlift

==== Evacuation of Kabul ====
In August 2021, elements of the 82nd Airborne Division, particularly the Immediate Response Force, deployed to Afghanistan to secure the evacuation of American diplomats and Afghan Special Immigrant Visa applicants as the Taliban seized land and converged on Kabul. Throughout Operation Allies Refuge, the 82nd Airborne Division served as the Operational Command, Task Force 82.

Operation Allies Refuge, led by Major General Chris Donahue, was a combined and joint NATO command post composed of forces representing NATO allied Nations, 1st Brigade Combat Team "Devil", aviation capabilities from the 82nd Combat Aviation Brigade "Pegasus", medical capabilities from the 44th Medical Brigade, riot control capabilities from the 16th Military Police Brigade, 24th Marine Expeditionary Unit, and the 3rd Expeditionary Sustainment Command who oversaw sustainment in the joint operational area from a command post in Kuwait.

==== Operation Epic Fury, 2026 ====
It was announced on 24 March 2026 that the Pentagon had ordered the commander of the 82nd Airborne Division, Major General Brandon R. Tegtmeier, and his headquarters staff to the Middle East, ahead of a potential deployment of a brigade combat team of around 3,000 troops to support operations against Iran. The U.S. Army extended the 82nd Airborne Division’s deployment to the Middle East to a full year, due to “operational requirements”. The extended deployment was announced by Major General Tegtmeier in a letter to military families.

== Division organization ==
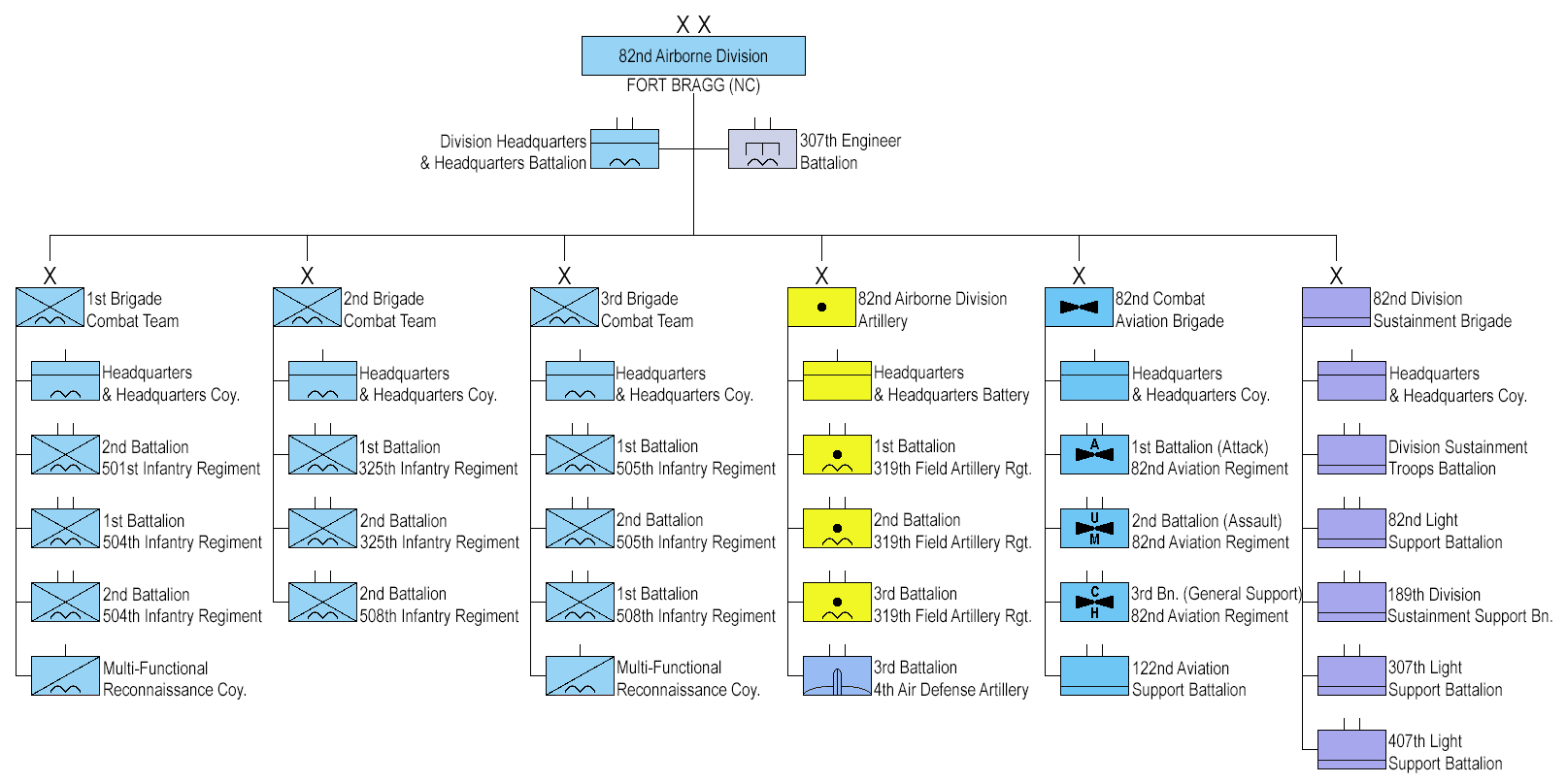
The organization of the 82nd Airborne Division, December 2025

82nd Airborne Division paratroopers conduct mass-attack training jump (3:55)

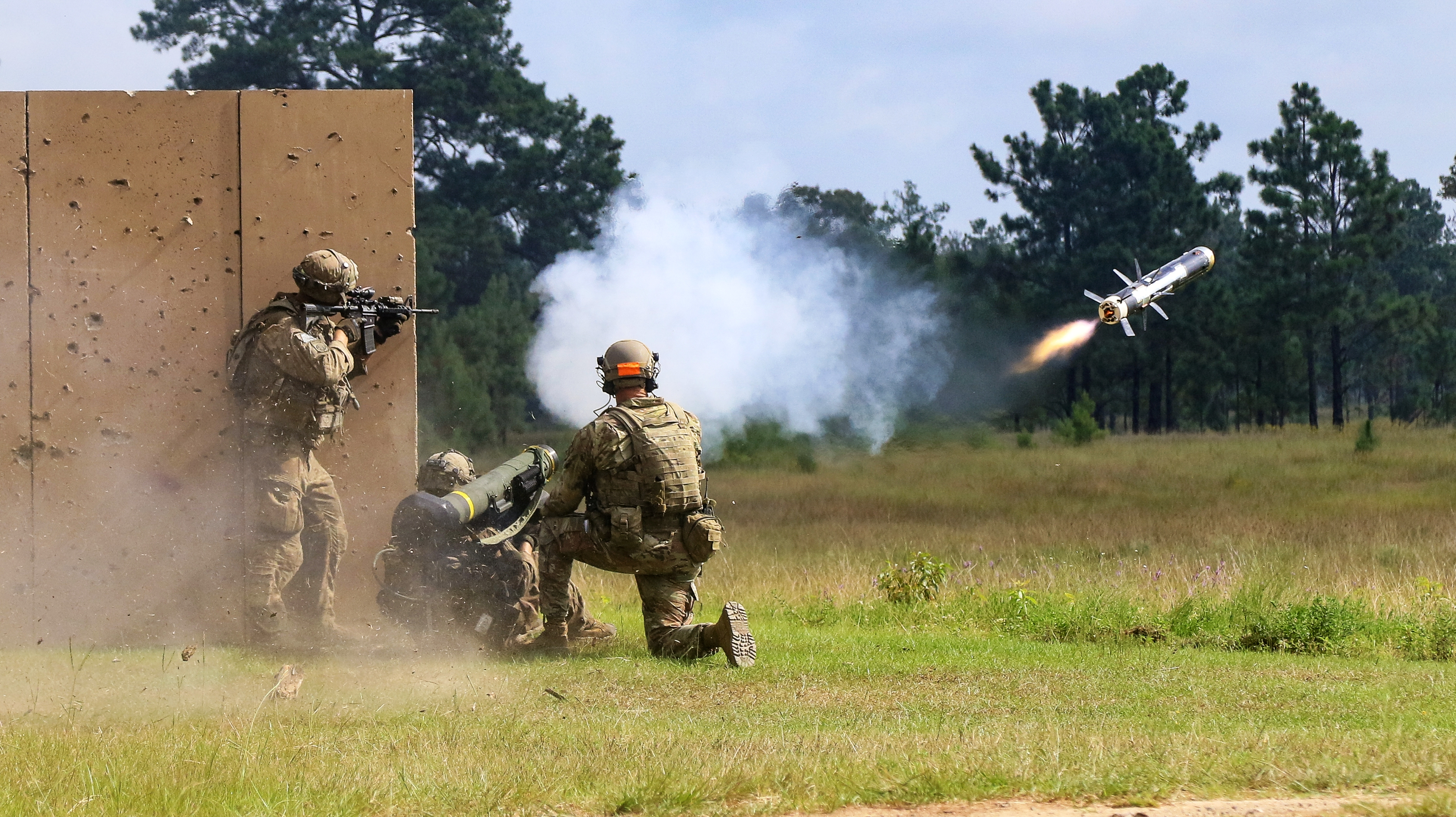
Paratroopers from 504th Infantry fire a FGM-148 Javelin at targets during exercise Decisive Action, July 2019

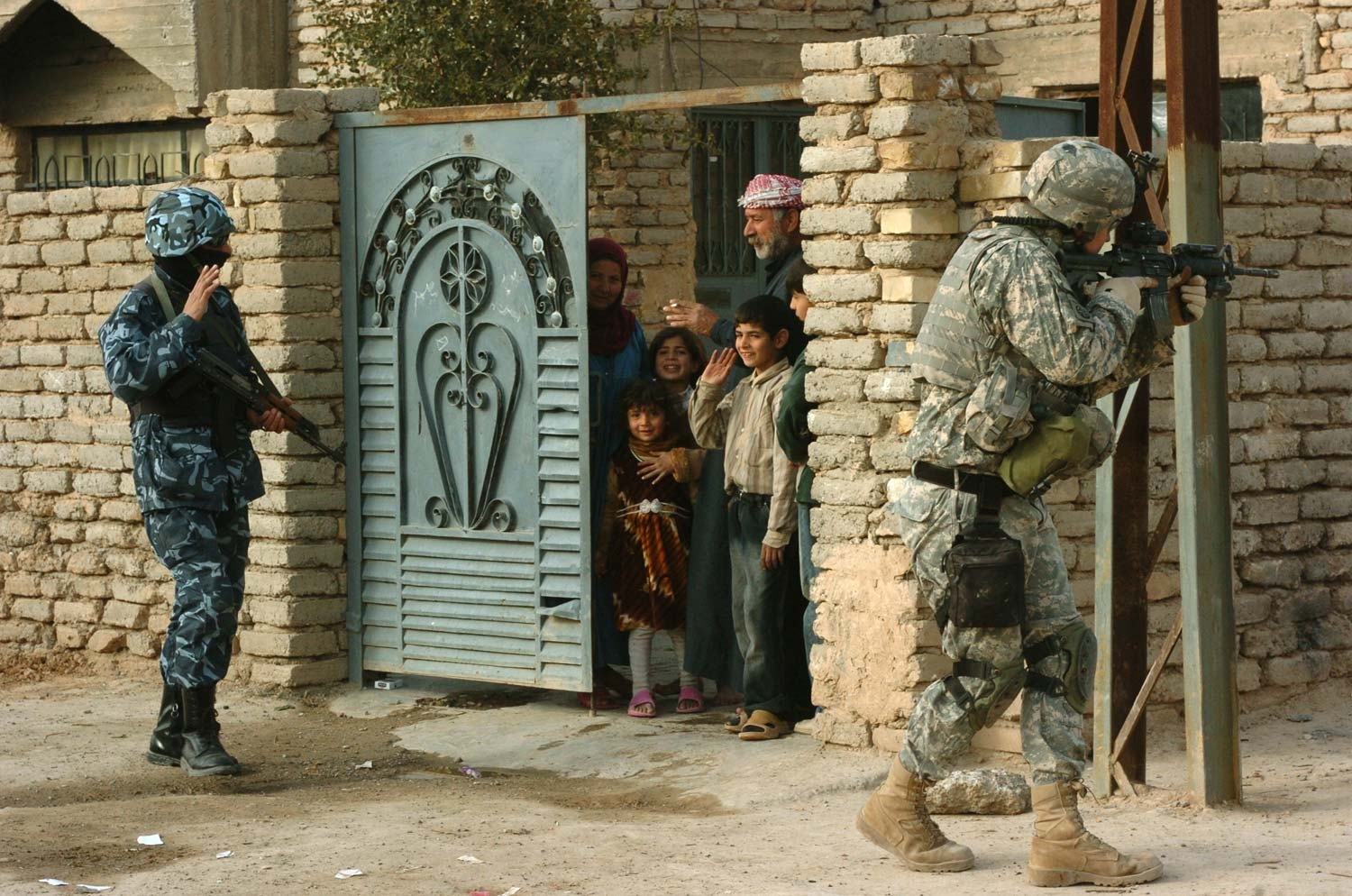
A paratrooper from 505th Infantry conducts joint patrol with an Iraqi policeman in Samarra, Iraq.

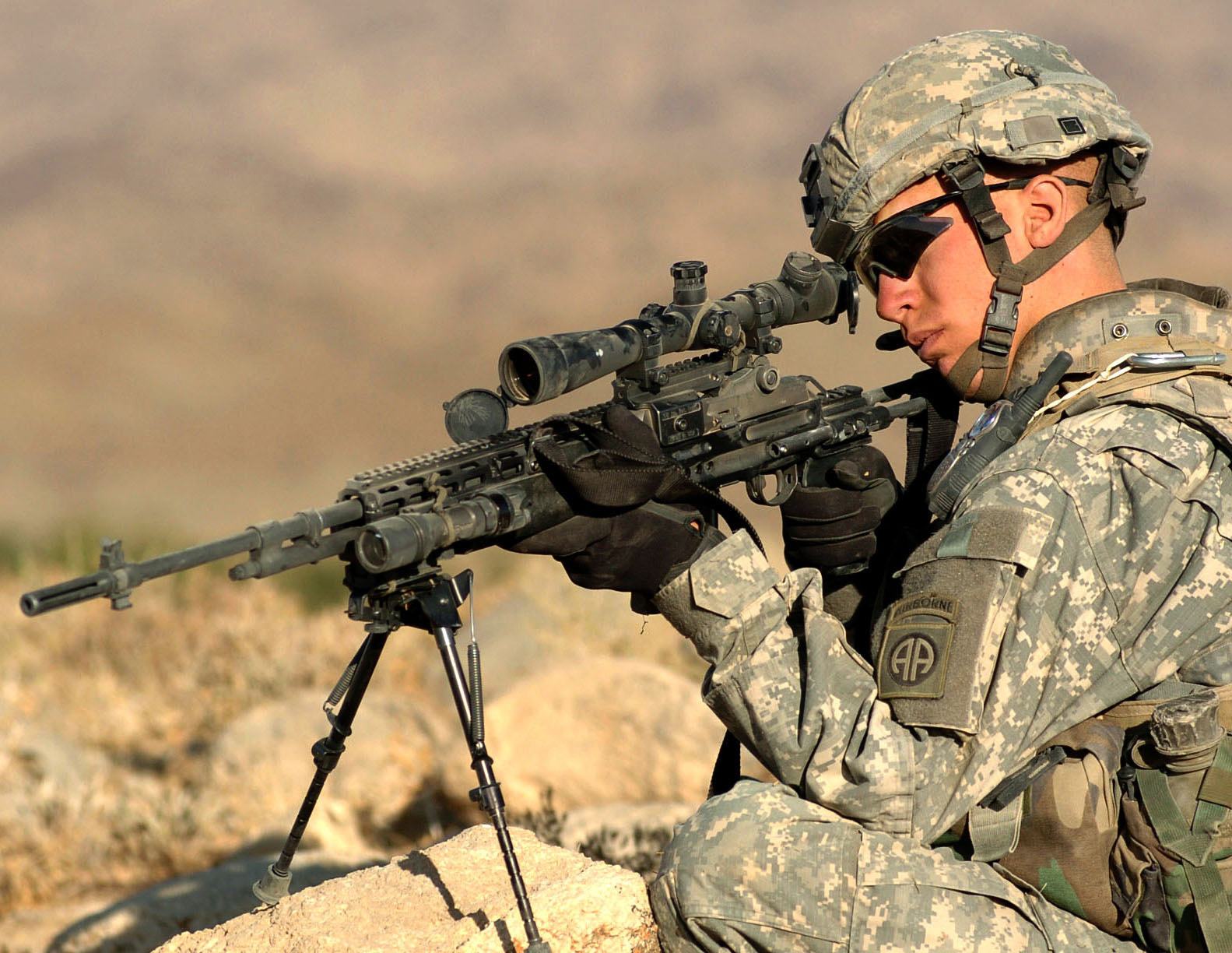
A paratrooper from 325th Infantry conducts overwatch in Afghanistan.

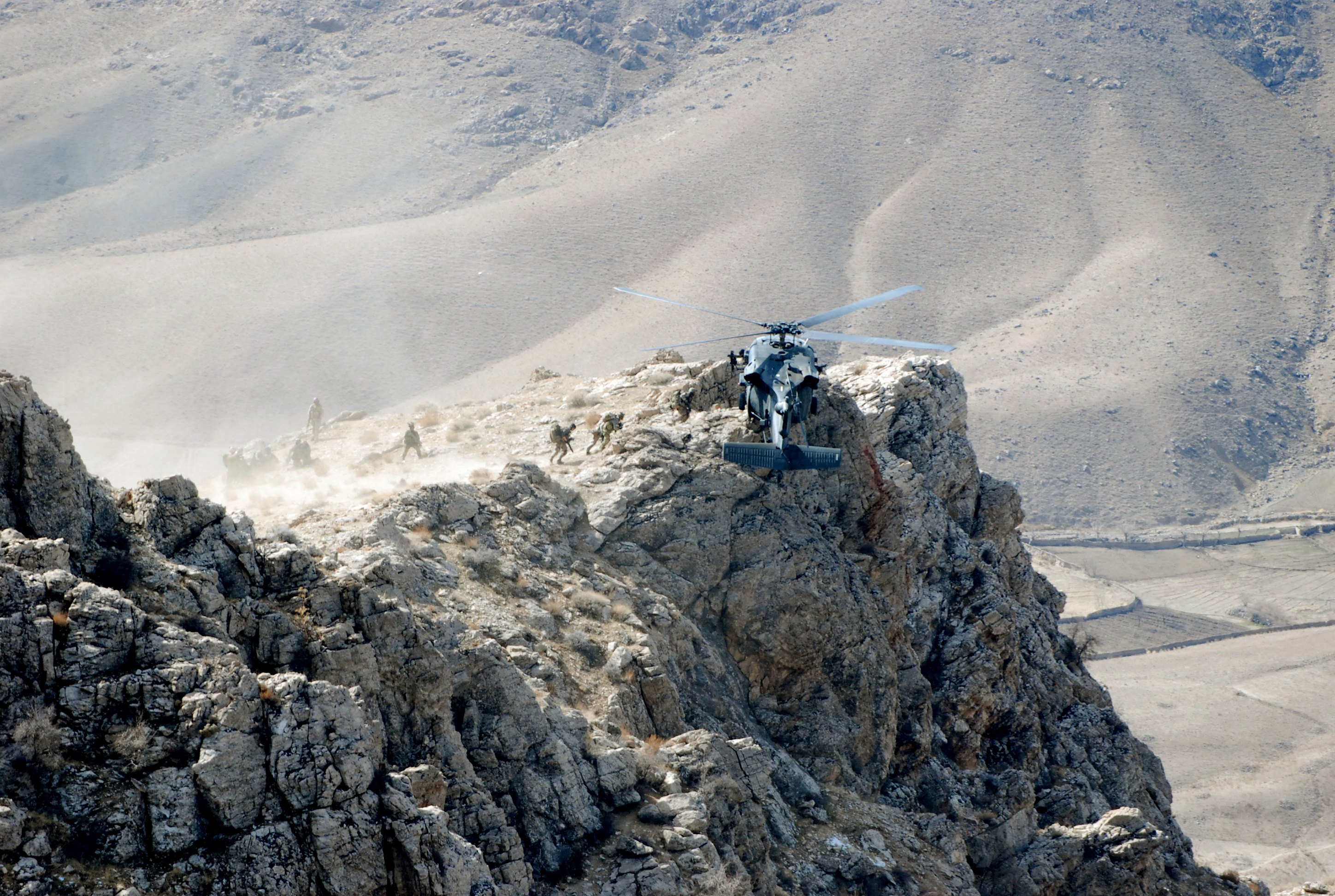
US Special Forces extraction by Company A, 2nd Battalion, 82nd Aviation Regiment in Afghanistan

The 82nd Airborne Division consists of a division headquarters and headquarters battalion, three infantry brigade combat teams, a division artillery, a combat aviation brigade, and a division sustainment brigade. The 82nd DIVARTY commands all artillery battalions.

- 82nd Airborne Division, in Fort Bragg, North Carolina
  - Division Headquarters and Headquarters Battalion
    - Headquarters and Headquarters Company
    - Operations Company (Company A)
    - Intelligence and Sustainment Company (Company B)
    - Signal Company (Company C)
    - Gainey Company (Provisional) (Division UAV and UGV testing unit)
    - 49th Public Affairs Detachment
    - 82nd Airborne Division Band
  - US Army Advanced Airborne School
  - 307th Engineer Battalion "Cobalt"
  - 82nd Signal Battalion "The Commander's Voice"
  - 1st Infantry Brigade Combat Team "Devil Brigade"
    - Headquarters and Headquarters Company
    - Multi-Functional Reconnaissance Company "Jackal"
    - 1st Battalion, 504th Infantry Regiment "Red Devils"
    - 2nd Battalion, 504th Infantry Regiment "White Devils"
    - 2nd Battalion, 501st Infantry Regiment "Geronimo"
  - 2nd Infantry Brigade Combat Team "Falcon Brigade"
    - Headquarters and Headquarters Company
    - 1st Battalion, 325th Infantry Regiment "Red Falcons"
    - 2nd Battalion, 325th Infantry Regiment "White Falcons"
    - 2nd Battalion, 508th Infantry Regiment "2 Fury or 2F"
  - 3rd Infantry Brigade Combat Team "Panther Brigade"
    - Headquarters and Headquarters Company
    - Multi-Functional Reconnaissance Company “Marauder company”
    - 1st Battalion, 505th Infantry Regiment "1 Panther or 1P"
    - 2nd Battalion, 505th Infantry Regiment "2 Panther or 2P"
    - 1st Battalion, 508th Infantry Regiment "1 Fury or 1F"
  - 82nd Division Artillery
    - Headquarters and Headquarters Battery
    - 1st Battalion, 319th Airborne Field Artillery Regiment "Loyalty"
    - 2nd Battalion, 319th Airborne Field Artillery Regiment "Black Falcons"
    - 3rd Battalion, 319th Airborne Field Artillery Regiment "Gun Devils"
    - 3rd Air Defense Battalion, 4th Air Defense Artillery Regiment
  - 82nd Combat Aviation Brigade "Pegasus Brigade"
    - Headquarters and Headquarters Company
    - 1st Battalion (Attack), 82nd Aviation Regiment (AH-64E Apache)
    - 2nd Battalion (Assault), 82nd Aviation Regiment (UH-60M Black Hawk)
    - 3rd Battalion (General Support), 82nd Aviation Regiment (CH-47 Chinook and UH-60 Black Hawk)
    - 122nd Aviation Support Battalion
  - 82nd Airborne Division Sustainment Brigade
    - Headquarters and Headquarters Company
    - 82nd Division Sustainment Troops Battalion
    - 189th Division Sustainment Support Battalion
    - 307th Light Support Battalion "Black Devils"
    - 82nd Light Support Battalion "Gators"
    - 407th Light Support Battalion "Griffin"

The division's 4th Brigade Combat Team inactivated in fall of 2013: the Special Troops Battalion, 4th Brigade Combat Team; the 2nd Battalion, 321st Field Artillery Regiment; and the 782nd Brigade Support Battalion were inactivated with some of the companies of the 782nd used to augment support battalions in the remaining three brigades.

The 4th Squadron, 73rd Cavalry joined the 1st Brigade Combat Team and formed the core of the newly activated 2nd Battalion, 501st Infantry Regiment. The 2nd Battalion, 508th Infantry Regiment joined the 2nd Brigade Combat Team, while the 1st Battalion, 508th Infantry Regiment joined the 3rd Brigade Combat Team.

== Traditions ==
To commemorate the 1944 Waal assault river crossing made by the 504th Parachute Infantry Regiment and the 307th Engineer Battalion (Airborne) during Operation Market Garden, an annual Crossing of the Waal competition is staged on the anniversary of the operation at McKellar's Lake near Fort Bragg. The winning company receives a paddle.

== Honors ==
=== Campaign participation credit ===
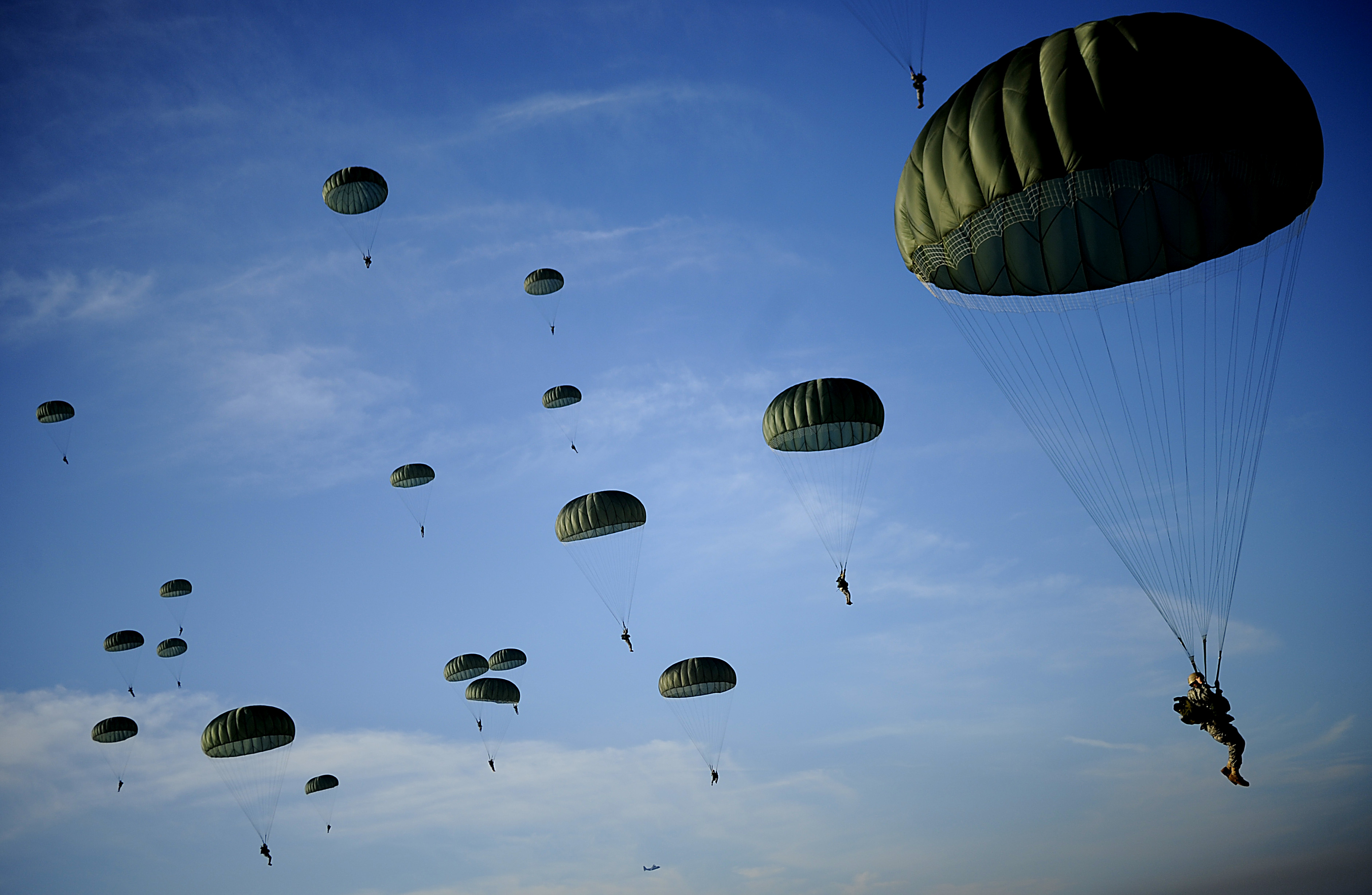
Soldiers with the 82nd Airborne Division descend under a parachute canopy to earn foreign jump wings during the 11th Annual Randy Oler Memorial Operation Toy Drop at Fort Bragg, North Carolina, December 2008.

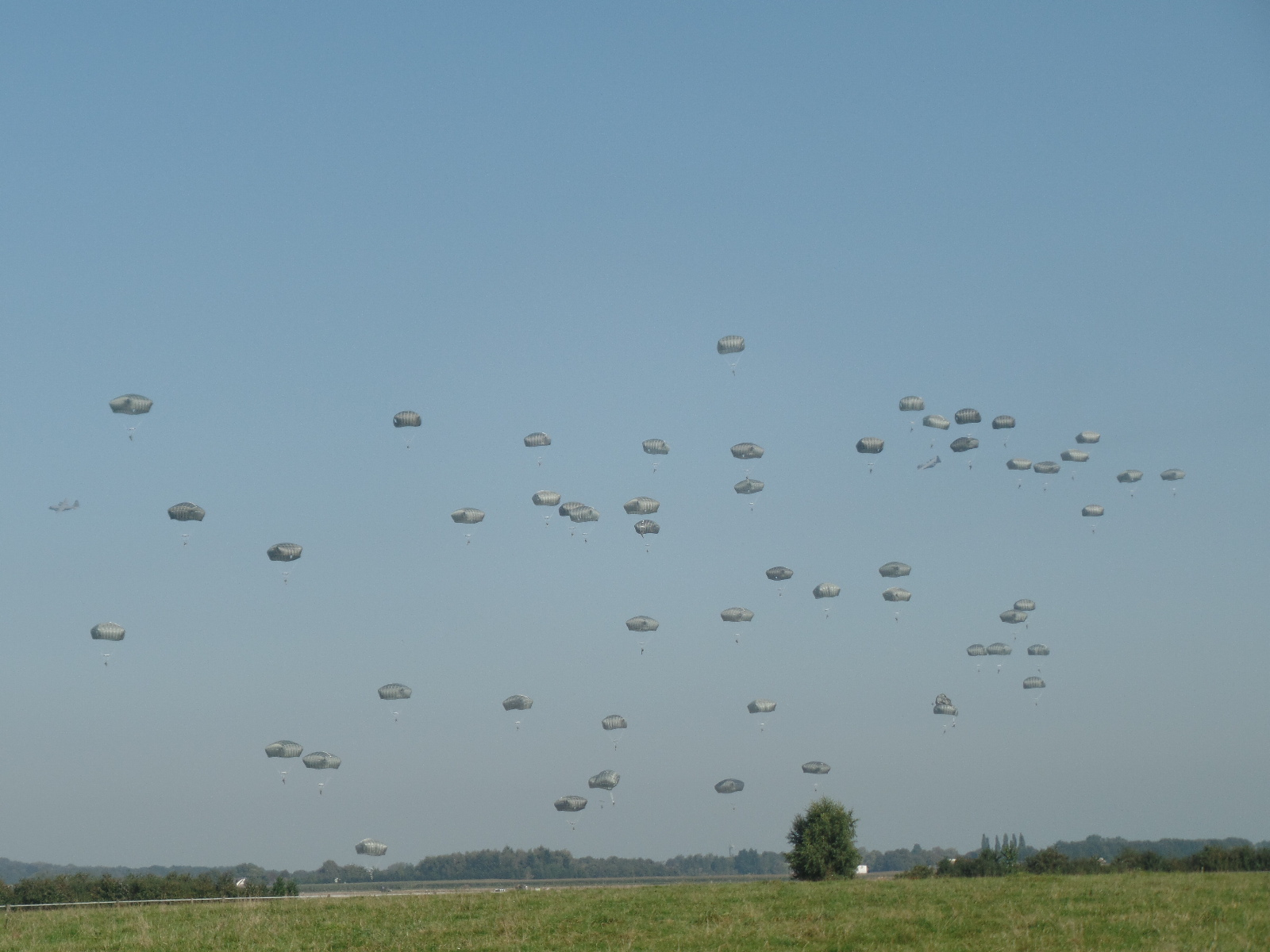
Paratroopers of the 82nd airborne division jump at the 2014 Market Garden memorial, Landgoed Den Heuvel, Groesbeek, Netherlands, September 2014

- World War I
1. St. Mihiel
2. Meuse-Argonne
3. Lorraine 1918
- World War II
1. Sicily
2. Naples-Foggia
3. Normandy (with arrowhead)
4. Rhineland (with arrowhead)
5. Ardennes-Alsace
6. Central Europe
- Armed Forces Expeditions
1. Dominican Republic
2. Grenada
3. Panama
- Southwest Asia
1. Defense of Saudi Arabia
2. Liberation and Defense of Kuwait

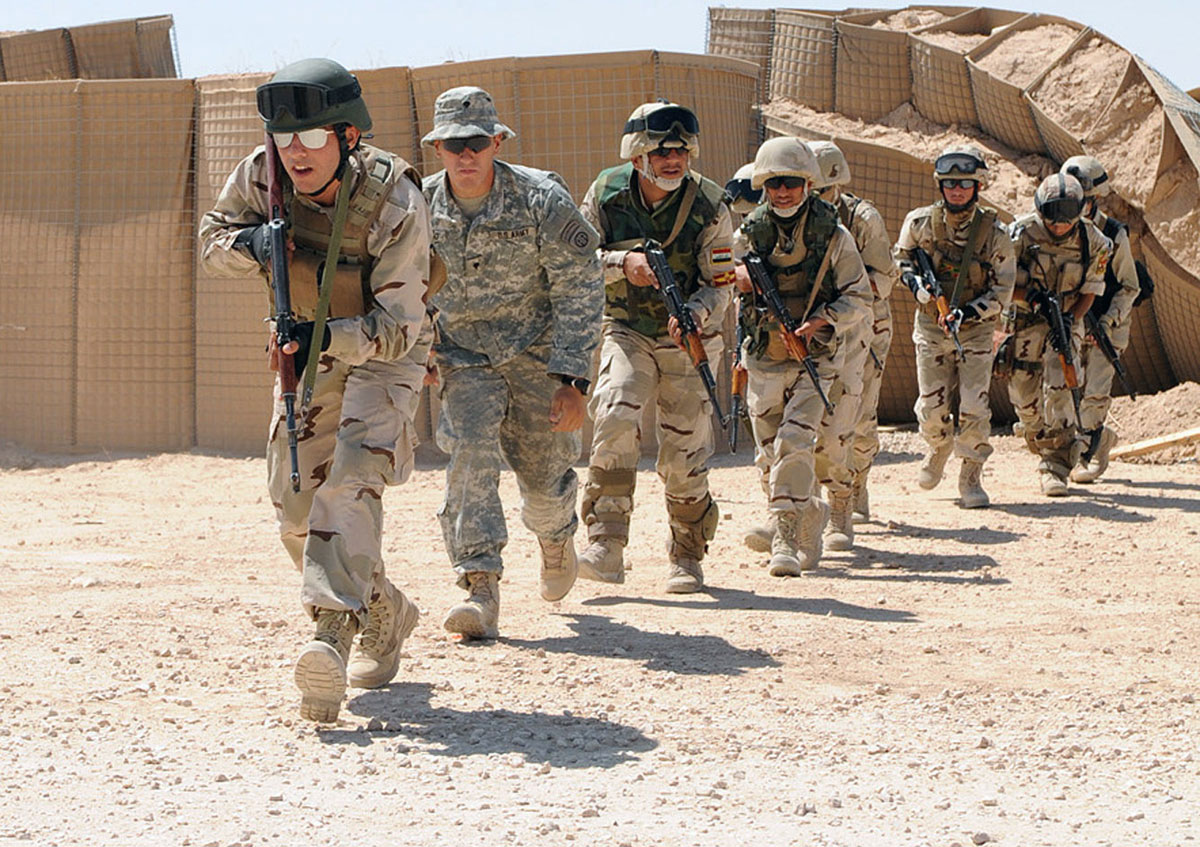
Iraqi commandos in June 2010, training under the supervision of soldiers from the 82nd Airborne

- Operation Enduring Freedom (OEF)
- Operation Iraqi Freedom (OIF)
- Operation New Dawn (OND)
- Operation Inherent Resolve (OIR)

=== Medal of Honor recipients ===
==== World War I ====
1. Lt. Col. Emory J. Pike
2. SGT. Alvin C. York

==== World War II ====
1. Pvt. John R. Towle
2. Pfc. Charles N. Deglopper
3. 1st Sgt. Leonard A. Funk Jr.
4. Pvt. Joe Gandara

==== Vietnam War ====
1. SSG Felix M. Conde-Falcon
2. Master Sergeant Roy P. Benavidez

=== Decorations ===
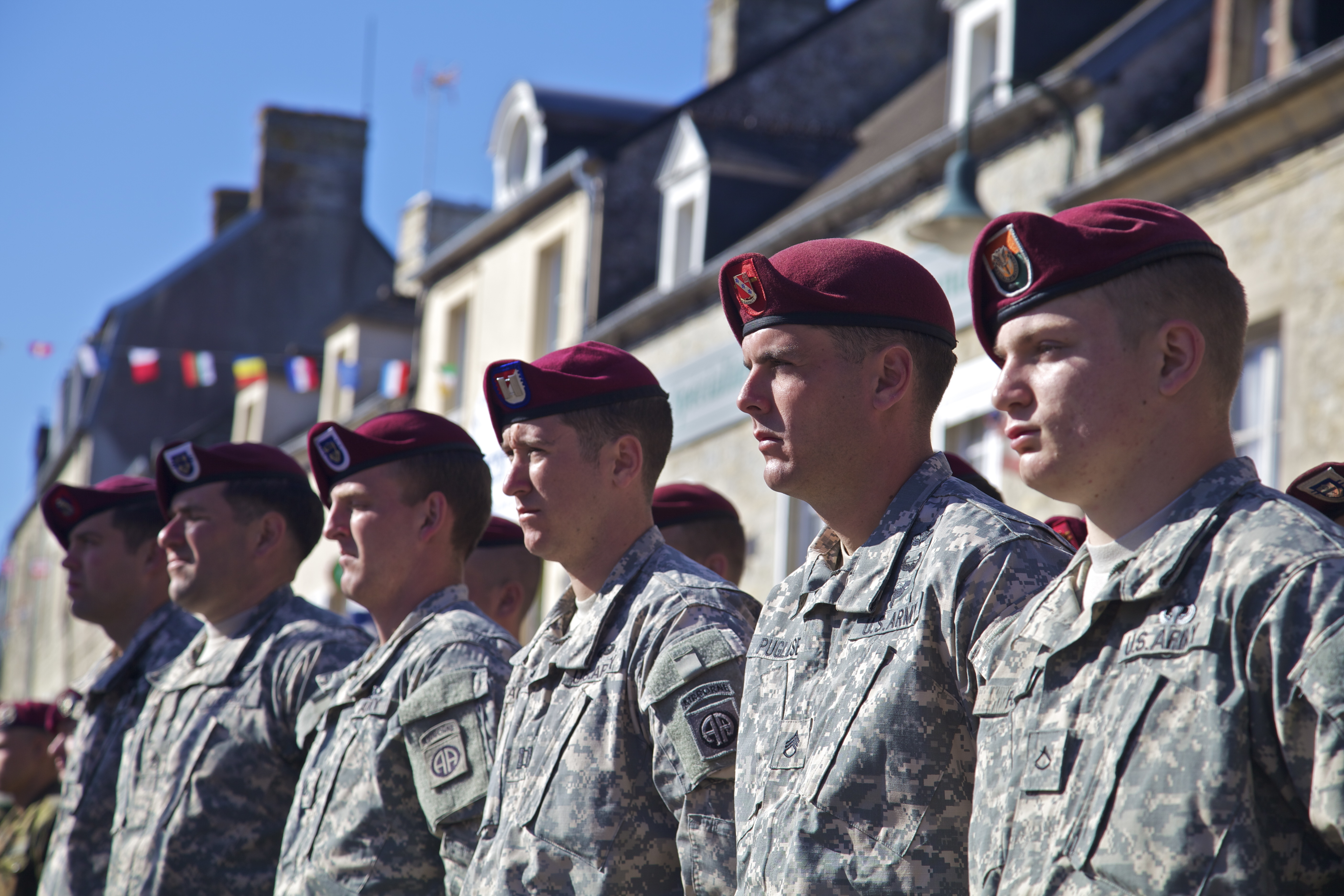
Paratroopers from the 82nd Airborne Division stand in formation at a ceremony in Sainte-Mère-Église, Normandy, on 6 June 2015, honoring the unit's liberation of the village in 1944

1. Presidential Unit Citation (Army) for Sainte-Mère-Église.
2. Presidential Unit Citation (Army) for Operation Market Garden.
3. Presidential Unit Citation (Army) for Chiunzi Pass/Naples/Foggia awarded to the following units of the 82nd Airborne: 319th Glider Field Artillery Battalion, 307th Engineer Battalion (2nd), 80th Anti-aircraft Battalion and Company H, 504 PIR
4. Presidential Unit Citation (Army) for the Battle of Samawah, April 2003, awarded to the following unit of the 82nd Airborne: 2nd Brigade Combat Team (325th Airborne Infantry Regiment)
5. Presidential Unit Citation (Army) for Operation Turki Bowl, OIF, November 2007, awarded to the following unit of the 82nd Airborne: 5th Squadron, 73rd Cavalry, 3rd Brigade, 505th PIR
6. Valorous Unit Citation (Army) for Operation Iraqi Freedom (3rd Brigade Combat Team, OIF 1)
7. Valorous Unit Citation (Army) for actions on the objective in the Baghdad neighborhood of Ghazaliya. While attached to the 3rd Brigade, 1st Armored Division. Cited in Department of the Army General Order 2009–10
8. Meritorious Unit Commendation (Army) for Southwest Asia.
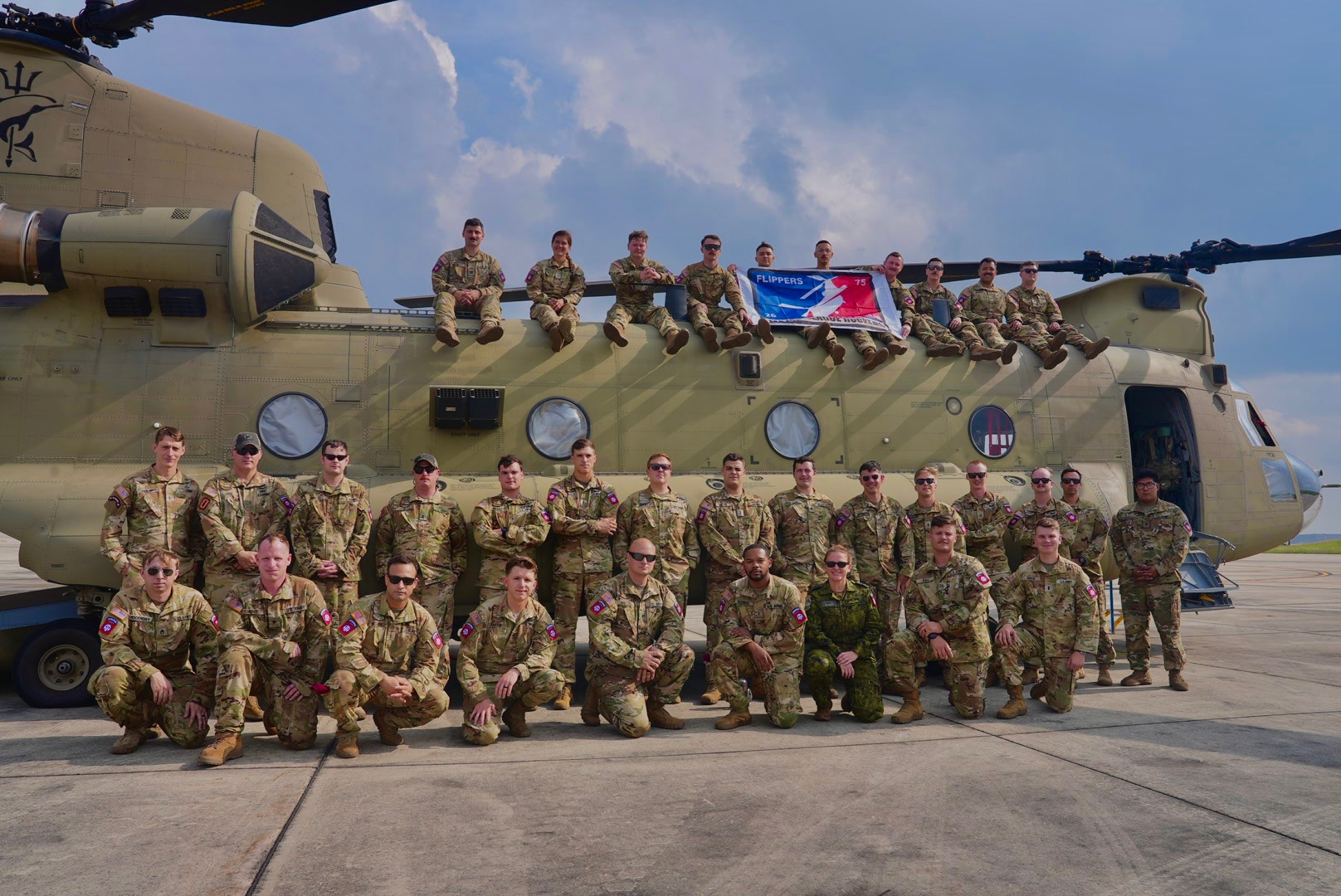
  82nd Airborne Division CH-47 crew preparing for the U.S. Army 250th Birthday Parade flyover in Washington, D.C., 14 June 2025
9. Superior Unit Award (Army) US Army Garrison, Ft Bragg 11 September 2001 – 15 April 2006 Cited in DAGO 2009–29
10. French Croix de Guerre with Palm, World War II for Sainte-Mère-Église.
11. French Croix de Guerre with Palm, World War II for Cotentin.
12. French Croix de Guerre, World War II, Fourragère
13. Belgian Fourragere 1940
14. Cited in the Order of the Day of the Belgian Army for action in the Ardennes
15. Cited in the Order of the Day of the Belgian Army for action in Belgium And Germany.
16. Military William Order, for bravery and valiant service in battle at Nijmegen 1944 during Market Garden (worn as an Orange Lanyard) 8 October 1945.

== Notable members ==
- General Lloyd Austin (born 1953), Commanding General of XVIII Airborne Corps, Commanding General of CENTCOM, 28th Secretary of Defense
- Master Sergeant Roy P. Benavidez (Medal of Honor Recipient), Vietnam War
- General of the Army Omar Bradley
- Moffatt Burriss, politician from South Carolina
- Jason Crow, member of the US House of Representatives for Colorado's 6th congressional district
- Fashion critic/choreographer Bruce Darnell (born 1957)
- Louisiana governor John Bel Edwards (born 1966)
- LTG Michael Flynn (born 1958), former commander of the 313th Military Intelligence Battalion and Division G-2
- Actor Dennis Franz (born 1944)
- Leonard A. Funk Jr. 508th P.I.R, WW2 Medal of Honor recipient and credited as the most highly decorated US Army Airborne soldier of the Second World War
- Lieutenant General James M. Gavin
- Colonel Chris Gibson (born 1964), former commander of the 2d Battalion, 325th Infantry Regiment, and later commander of the division's 2d Brigade Combat Team, former New York Congressman
- Melvin O. Handrich (Medal of Honor Recipient, Korean War; First Special Service Force and Company I, 508th Parachute Infantry in World War II)
- Mark T. Vande Hei (born 1966), Col (En) (ret.), prior engineer platoon leader in 3/325th Infantry
- Real life Goodfellas movie mobster, Henry Hill served as a cook in the Division from 1960 to 1963.
- Sean D. Jordan, judge
- Clint Lorance (born 1984), officer convicted of second-degree murder for battlefield deaths; pardoned
- Jacklyn H. Lucas, the youngest Marine to receive the Medal of Honor, who then re-enlisted and became a Captain in the 82nd
- Senator Dave McCormick (born 1965), Captain who served in the Gulf War
- Wes Moore, 63rd governor of Maryland
- Platoon Forward Observer and Member of USA National Bobsled Team Lou Moreira
- Country music singer Craig Morgan (born 1964)
- Patrick Murphy, Under Secretary of the Army (born 1973)
- Actor Noble Craig, Vietnam War
- R&B singer Lou Rawls Sergeant in B Co 2/505 ABN INF 1956–58
- Senator Jack Reed (born 1949)
- Dennis Richmond, journalist
- Syracuse University football coach Ben Schwartzwalder
- General "Henry" Hugh Shelton (Chairman of the Joint Chiefs of Staff from 1997 to 2001)
- Private John Steele who famously got hung up on a parapet of the church bell tower when jumping into Sainte-Mère-Église during the first hours of D-Day.
- Senator Strom Thurmond (325th Glider Infantry Regiment in World War II)
- Actor William Windom
- Colonel Benjamin H. Vandervoort who led the 2nd Battalion, 505th PIR on D-Day and the 3rd Battalion, 504th PIR during Operation Market Garden.
- Sergeant Alvin C. York (Medal of Honor recipient), World War I
- Trae Stewart Spurlock a 2x combat veteran killed by the Casper Police Department
- James Megellas One of the most decorated veterans of the 82nd

== See also ==
- List of commanders of 82nd Airborne Division (United States)
- 82nd Airborne Division War Memorial Museum
- United States military beret flash
- Geneviève Duboscq
- Medal of Honor: Airborne
- Monica Lin Brown
- World War II combat jump airfields:
  - RAF Balderton
  - RAF Barkston Heath
  - RAF Chalgrove
  - RAF Cottesmore
  - RAF Folkingham
  - RAF Merryfield
  - RAF Membury
  - RAF North Witham
  - RAF Ramsbury
  - RAF Saltby
  - RAF Spanhoe

International:

- British Parachute Regiment
- Maroon beret
