= Julian Cook =

United States Army officer

Julian Aaron Cook
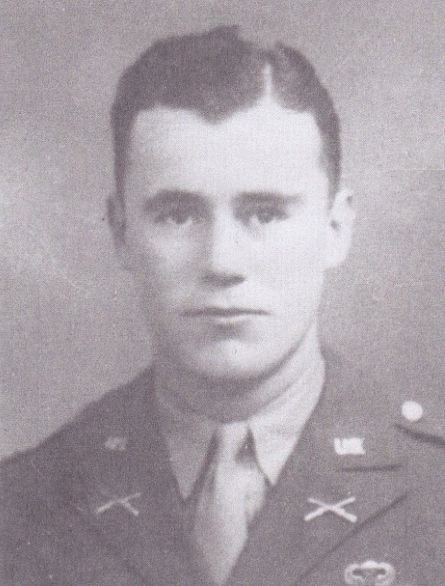
- Born: October 7, 1916; Mount Holly, Vermont, United States
- Died: June 19, 1990 (aged 73); Columbia, South Carolina, United States
- Military career
- Allegiance: United States of America
- Branch: United States Army
- Service years: 1940–1968
- Rank: Colonel
- Service number: 0-23290
- Unit: Infantry Branch
- Commands: 3rd Battalion, 504th Parachute Infantry Regiment
- Conflicts: World War II
- Awards: Distinguished Service Cross; Legion of Merit; Bronze Star Medal (2); Purple Heart (3); Military William Order

Colonel Julian Aaron Cook (October 7, 1916 – June 19, 1990) was an officer of the United States Army who gained fame during World War II for his crossing of the Waal river during Operation Market Garden in September 1944.

== Biography ==
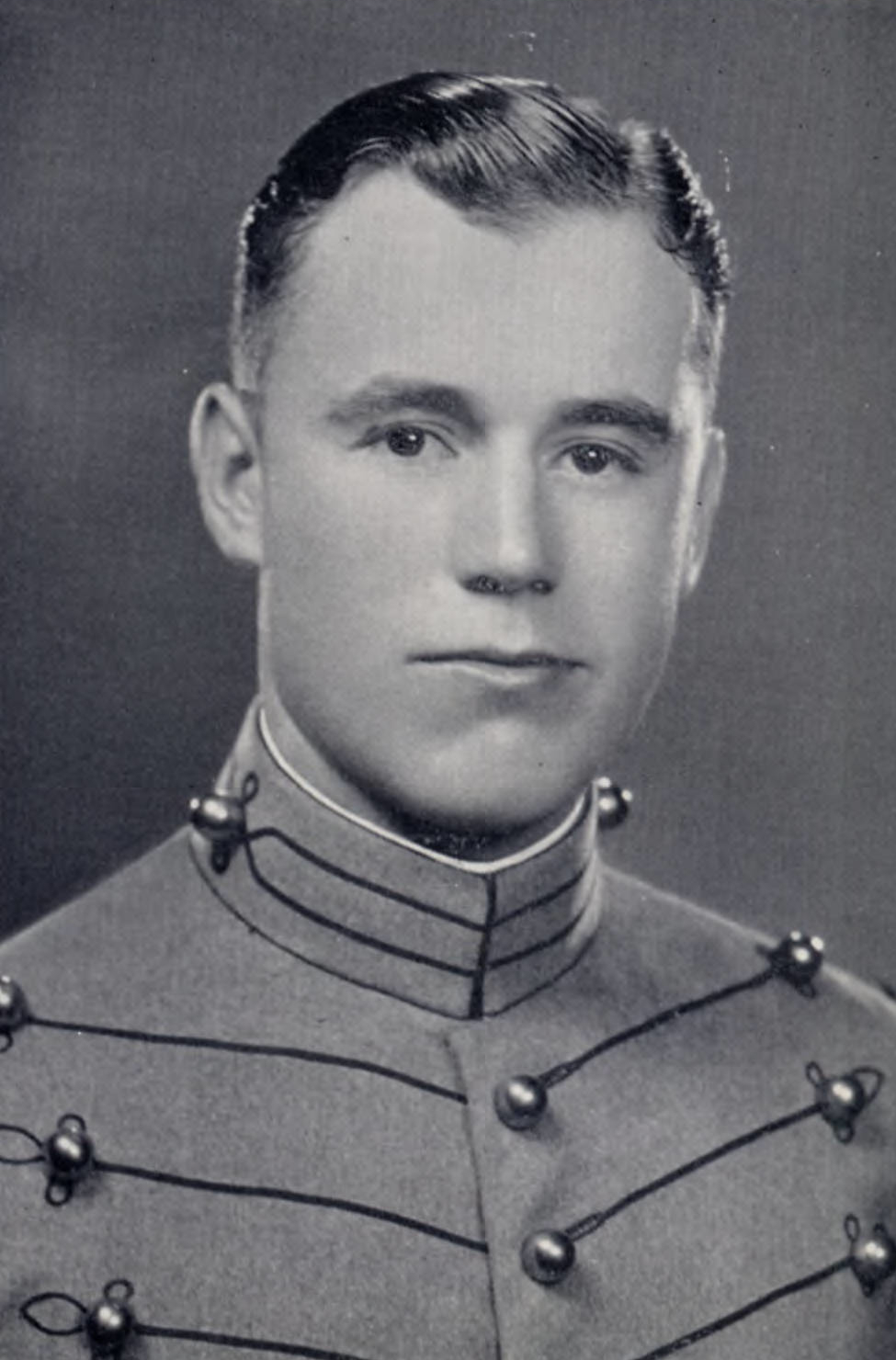
Cook as a West Point cadet in 1940

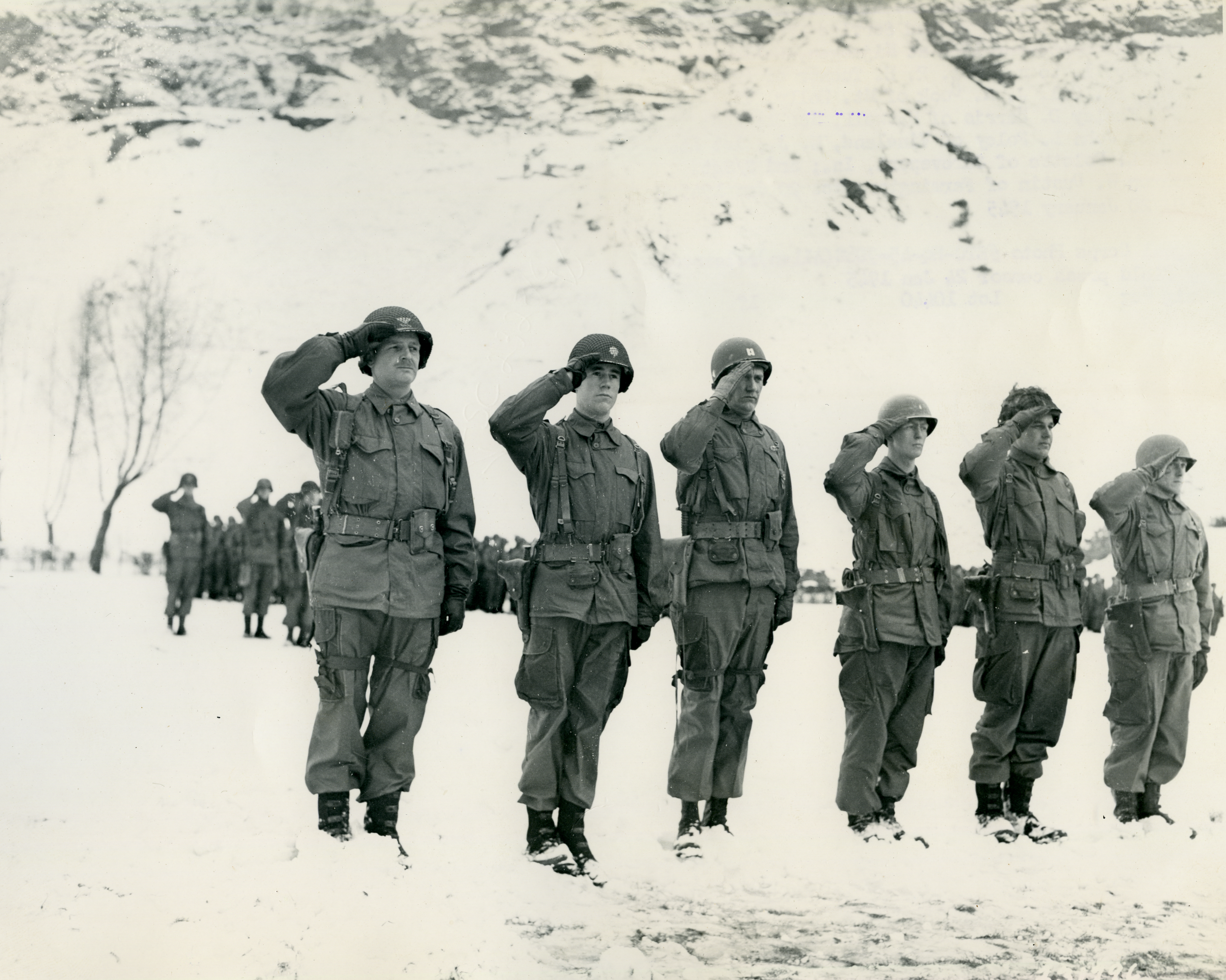
Cook (second from left) salutes after receiving the Distinguished Service Cross for his 20 September actions in Nijmegen c. January 1945. Reuben Tucker, his regimental commander, stands at the far left.

Cook was born at Mount Holly, Vermont, on October 7, 1916, to an American father Nelson Pingrey Cook and an English mother of Irish descent, Honora (nee Gallagher). His parents met when Nelson, a travelling salesman in the UK, stopped for the night in a hotel in West Auckland, County Durham, and having enjoyed his evening meal, asked to compliment the cook, Honora Gallagher.

Julian Cook attended the United States Military Academy at West Point, and was commissioned as a second lieutenant on graduation in 1940. He volunteered for the airborne forces in 1941, joining the 504th Parachute Infantry Regiment (504th PIR) as a cadre member on May 1, 1942, which became part of the 82nd "All American" Airborne Division. Cook started as regimental adjutant, as described in detail in Birth of a Regiment.

Cook made combat jumps into Sicily, Salerno, and Anzio before taking command of the 3rd Battalion of the 504th PIR in the spring of 1944, just months before Operation Market Garden. The regiment, due to heavy losses in Italy and a lack of airborne replacements, did not participate in the Allied invasion of Normandy.

On September 17, 1944, Major Cook jumped into the Netherlands near Overasselt. His battalion was initially involved in patrols to Wychen and Diervoort. Cook's most important battle was the Waal River Crossing, as detailed in great detail in The Battle of the Bridges.

Brigadier General James M. Gavin, commanding the 82nd Airborne, had ordered a crossing of the Waal River during daylight hours so the Americans could outflank the German defenders, who were dug in around the city's crucial bridges. Put in charge of the crossing, Cook was in the first wave across the river. As Cook's first wave began their crossing, the Allied bombardment began. The wind blew away the smokescreen, leaving the men in the water visible to the German guns. As a devout Catholic, Cook loudly recited Hail Mary during the crossing, spurring his men on under the withering fire. He took charge of the boats, redirecting those who had become disoriented and pushing the men along. Once ashore, the 504th PIR cleared the river bank, moved north and assaulted the railway bridge over the highway leading to the main road bridge in the village of Lent. Cook was subsequently awarded the Distinguished Service Cross, the citation for which reads:

The President of the United States of America, authorized by Act of Congress, July 9, 1918, takes pleasure in presenting the Distinguished Service Cross to Major (Infantry) Julian Aaron Cook (ASN: 0-23290), United States Army, for extraordinary heroism in connection with military operations against an armed enemy while serving as Commanding Officer, 3d Battalion, 504th Parachute Infantry Regiment, 82d Airborne Division, in action against enemy forces on 20 September 1944, near Nijmegen, Holland. Major Cook led his battalion with unparalleled bravery in the initial assault wave during the daring daylight crossing of the Waal River. Although his boatload suffered heavy casualties as a result of the incessant enemy small arms and artillery fire which raked the 250 yard wide stream, he guided the barge safely ashore. Although still under heavy fire, Major Cook remained on the river bank directing the remainder of his battalion coming ashore. On several occasions he plunged back into the river to pull damaged boats ashore and to care for the wounded. During the crossing heavy casualties were suffered, but Major Cook quickly reorganized the remainder of his battalion and led it successfully from objective to objective during the 4000-yard attack, until the north end of the Nijmegen bridge was reached and seized. Major Cook's thoroughness in effecting rapid reorganization and consolidation after the seizure of each intermediate objective was highly instrumental in the success of the entire operation. Major Cook's inspiring leadership, personal bravery and zealous devotion to duty exemplify the highest traditions of the military forces of the United States and reflect great credit upon himself, the 82d Airborne Division, and the United States Army.

After Market Garden, Cook was promoted to lieutenant colonel. Cook led his battalion during the Ardennes offensive in fighting around Trois-Ponts, Cheneux and Herresbach, and later on in the drive through Germany. At the end of the war, he was promoted to colonel.

In 1953 Cook became American liaison officer to the French forces in French Indochina. There he became ill, and spent eight months in hospitals.

He died at Columbia, South Carolina, on June 19, 1990.

Robert Redford portrayed Cook in the 1977 film A Bridge Too Far.

== Honors and awards ==
On October 8, 1945, by Royal Decree, Cook was knighted by Queen Wilhelmina, with the rank of Knight 4th class of the Military William Order. The Order is the highest and oldest honour of the Kingdom of the Netherlands, which is bestowed for "performing excellent acts of Bravery, Leadership and Loyalty in battle". It is comparable to the French Légion d'honneur or the American Medal of Honor, but far less frequently awarded.

On September 19, 2022, a plaque was unveiled in Cook's honor on an apartment complex named after him in Nijmegen, the Netherlands.

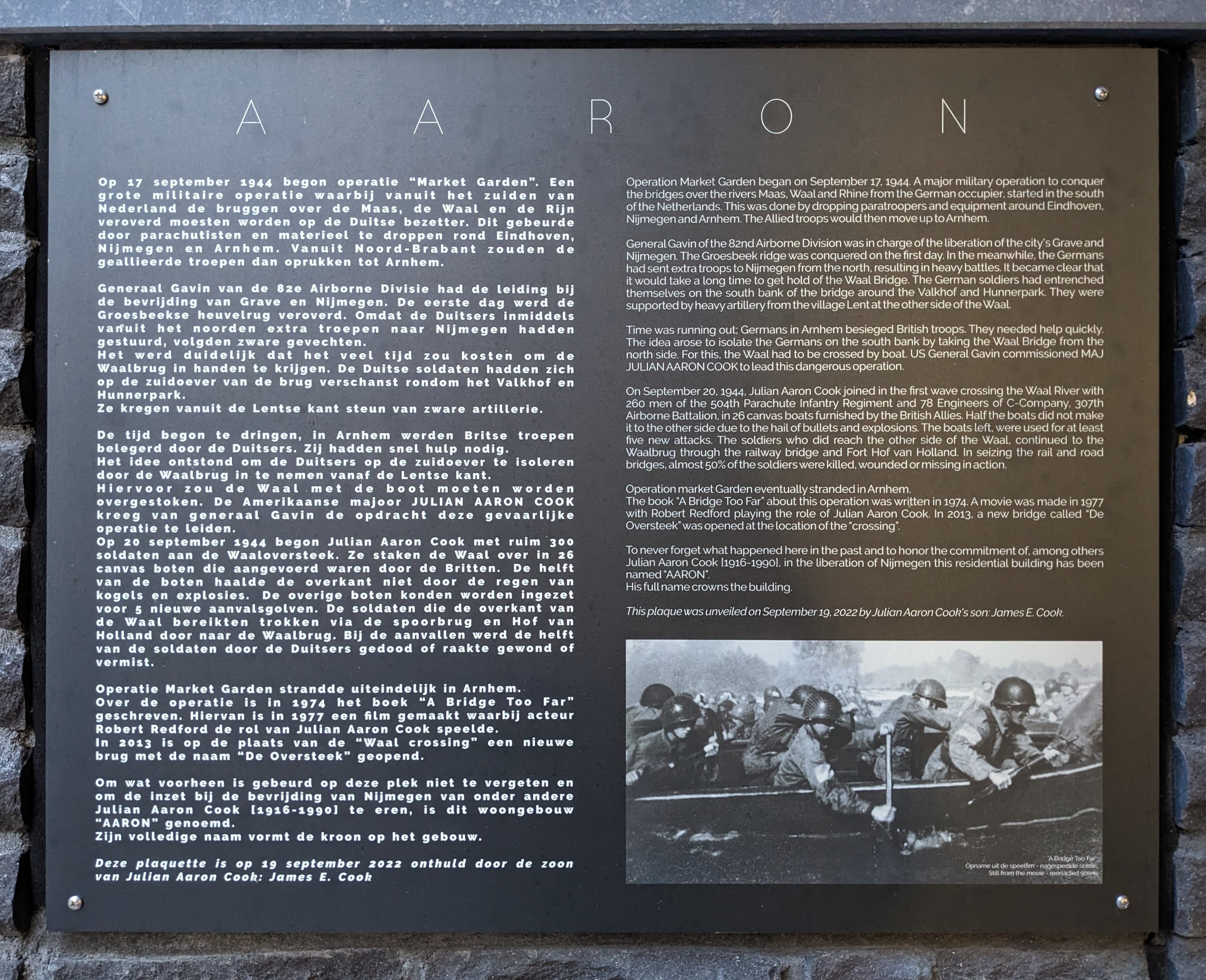
Plaque

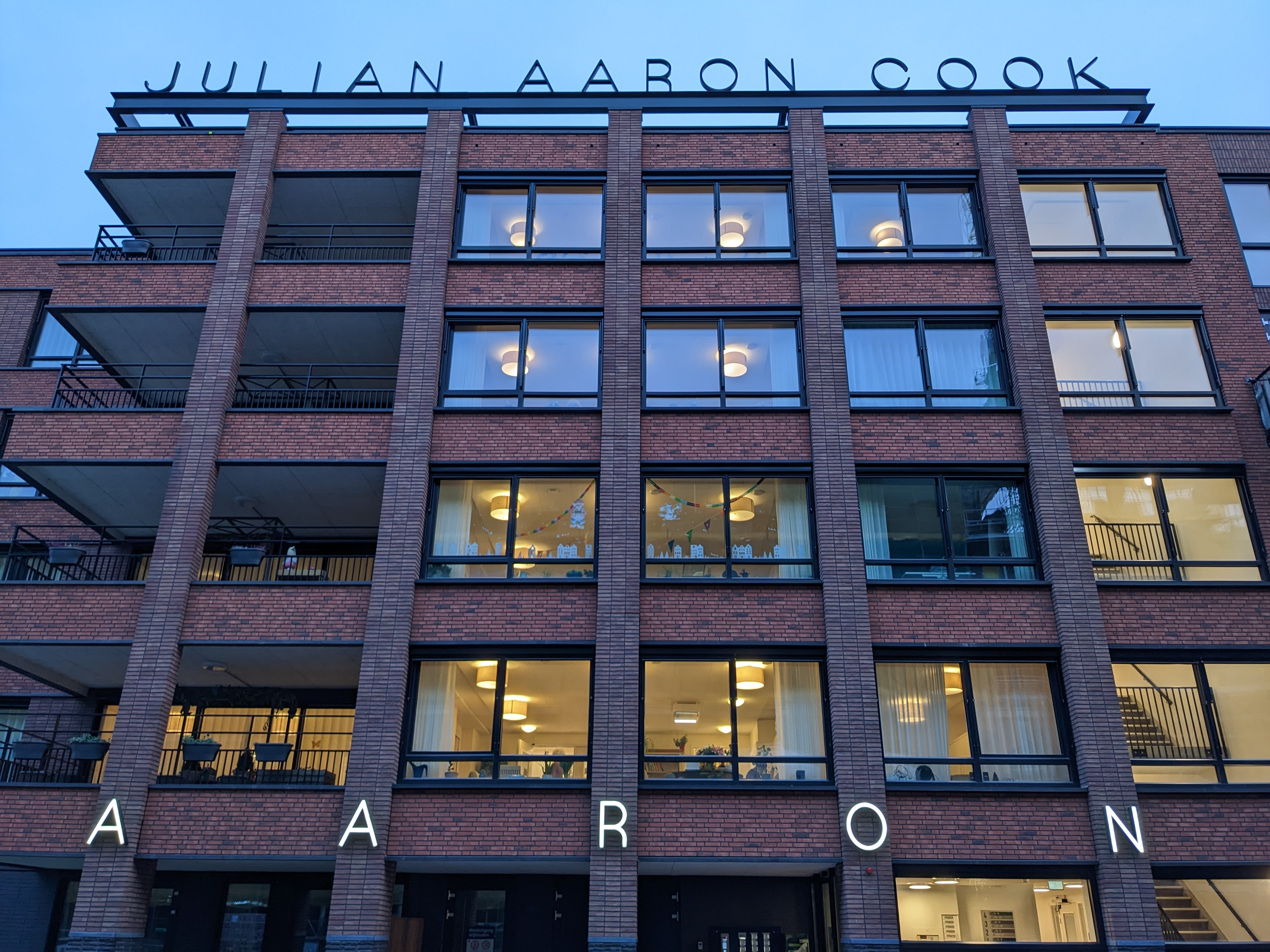
Apartment complex named after Julian Cook

== Bibliography ==
- Lunteren, Frank van, Birth of a Regiment: The 504th Parachute Infantry Regiment in Sicily and Salerno. Permuted Press LLC, 2022.
- Lunteren, Frank van, The Battle of the Bridges: The 504th Parachute Infantry Regiment in Operation Market Garden. Casemate Publishing, 2014.
