= Patrick J. Donahue II =

United States Army general

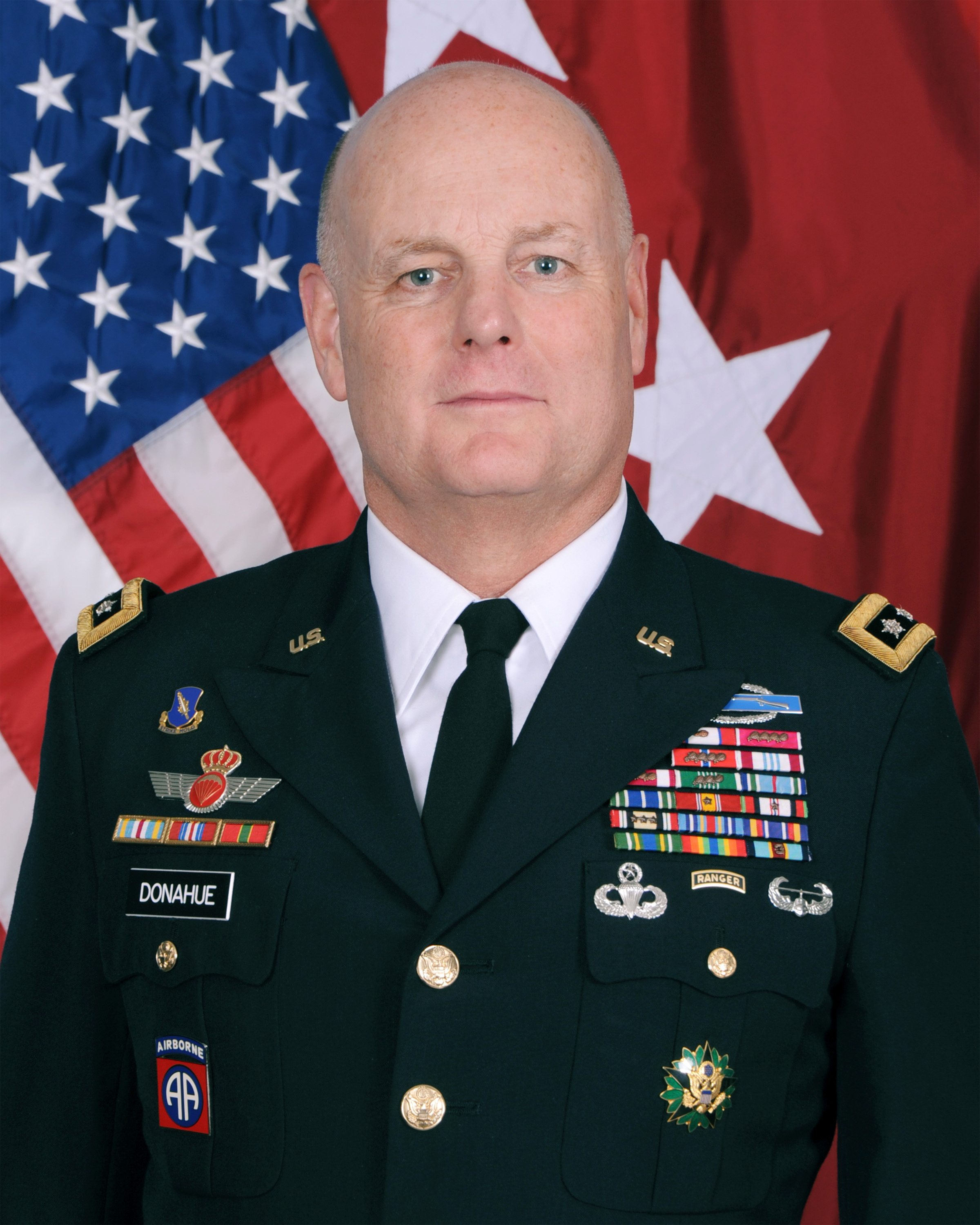
- Born: December 24, 1957 (age 68); New Jersey, United States
- Allegiance: United States of America
- Branch: United States Army
- Service years: 1980–2017
- Rank: Lieutenant general
- Commands: Deputy Commander, United States Army Forces Command; United States Army Africa

Patrick James Donahue II (born December 24, 1957) is a United States Army lieutenant general who served as deputy commander, United States Army Forces Command (FORSCOM).

Donahue was born in Hawaii on December 24, 1957. His father, Robert J. Donahue was a lieutenant general in the United States Army. He graduated from the United States Military Academy and was commissioned as an infantry officer in the Regular Army in 1980. His military education includes the Infantry Officer Basic and Advanced Courses, Ranger School, United States Air Command and Staff College, and the United States Army War College. He was an Olmsted Scholar and studied at the University of Innsbruck, Austria. He holds a master's in Public Administration from Harvard University, and a master's of Strategic Studies from the Army War College. Lt. Gen. Donahue commanded airborne and air assault units at the company, battalion, brigade levels, and most recently a theater Army.

Donahue was previously the Commanding General, United States Army Africa, Vicenza, Italy. He also served as the Deputy Chief of Staff, U.S. Army Training and Doctrine Command, Joint Base Langley-Eustis, Virginia, Deputy Commanding General (Maneuver), 3rd Infantry Division, Fort Stewart, Georgia and U.S. Division North-Iraq from 2008 to 2010; Commander, 1st Brigade, 82nd Airborne Division from 2003 to 2006 and commanded the brigade combat team on two deployments to Afghanistan and one to Iraq; Commander, Operations Group Bravo, U.S. Army Battle Command Training Program/Chief of Future Operations, V Corps from 2002 to 2003 for the initial Iraq invasion; and Assistant Chief of Staff, G3 and Commander, 1st Battalion 506th Infantry Regiment (Air Assault), 2nd Infantry Division, Republic of Korea from 1998 to 2001.

== Awards and decorations ==
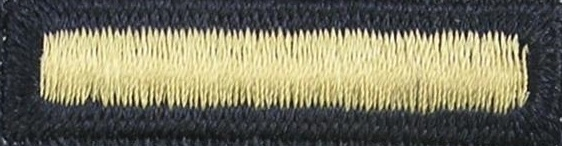
| Combat Infantryman Badge |
| Expert Infantryman Badge |
| Master Parachutist Badge |
| Ranger tab |
| Air Assault Badge |
| Army Staff Identification Badge |
| Spanish parachutist badge |
| 82nd Airborne Division Combat Service Identification Badge |
| 504th Infantry Regiment Distinctive Unit Insignia |
| 5 Overseas Service Bars |

| Army Distinguished Service Medal with two bronze oak leaf clusters |
| Legion of Merit with four oak leaf clusters |
| Bronze Star Medal with four oak leaf clusters |
| Defense Meritorious Service Medal |
| Meritorious Service Medal with three oak leaf clusters |
| Army Commendation Medal with three oak leaf clusters |
| Joint Service Achievement Medal |
| Army Achievement Medal |
| Joint Meritorious Unit Award |
| Valorous Unit Award |
| Superior Unit Award |
| National Defense Service Medal with one bronze service star |
| Afghanistan Campaign Medal with one service star |
| Iraq Campaign Medal with three service stars |
| Global War on Terrorism Expeditionary Medal |
| Global War on Terrorism Service Medal |
| Korea Defense Service Medal |
| Army Service Ribbon |
| Army Overseas Service Ribbon with bronze award numeral 3 |
