= 504th Infantry Regiment =

Military unit of the United States Army

504th Parachute Infantry Regiment 504th Airborne Infantry Regiment 504th Infantry Regiment
- 504th Parachute Infantry Regiment coat of arms
- Active: 1942–present
- Country: United States
- Branch: United States Army
- Size: Regiment
- Garrison/HQ: Fort Bragg, North Carolina
- Nicknames: 1st Battalion= "Red Devils"; 2nd Battalion= "White Devils"; 3rd Battalion= "Blue Devils"
- Motto: Strike Hold
- Colors: Blue
- Engagements: World War II: Operation Husky; Operation Avalanche; Operation Shingle; Operation Overlord (Small contingent serving as pathfinders); Operation Market Garden; Battle of the Bulge; Western Allied invasion of Germany; Armed Forces Expeditions: Operation Powerpack; Operation Urgent Fury; Operation Golden Pheasant; Operation Just Cause; Southwest Asia: Operation Desert Shield; Operation Desert Storm; Operation Enduring Freedom; Operation Iraqi Freedom; Operation Freedom's Sentinel; Operation Inherent Resolve
- Decorations: Presidential Unit Citation (4); Valorous Unit Award; Meritorious Unit Commendation; Army Superior Unit Award; Military Order of William; Belgian Fourragere; Netherlands Orange Lanyard; Cited in Order of the Day of the Belgian Army (2)

Commanders
- Notable commanders: Reuben Tucker; William Westmoreland; Hugh Shelton; John Abizaid; David Petraeus; John Campbell; Patrick J. Donahue; Theodore Kleisner

Insignia
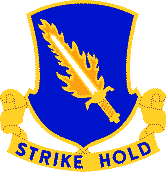
- Distinctive unit insignia

The 504th Infantry Regiment, originally the 504th Parachute Infantry Regiment (504th PIR), is an airborne forces regiment of the United States Army, part of the 82nd Airborne Division and 173rd Airborne Brigade, with a long and distinguished history. The regiment was first formed in mid-1942 during World War II as part of the 82nd Airborne Division and saw service in Sicily, Italy, Anzio, the Netherlands, Belgium and Germany.

A parent regiment under the United States Army Regimental System, three battalions from the regiment, 1st Battalion (1-504 PIR) and 2nd Battalion (2-504 PIR) are currently active with 1st Brigade Combat Team, 82nd Airborne Division and 3rd Battalion (3-504 PIR) is active with the 173rd Airborne Brigade.

== World War II ==
=== Activation ===
The regiment was initially constituted on 24 February 1942, over two months after the Japanese attack on Pearl Harbor and the subsequent American entry into World War II, in the Army of the United States as the 504th Parachute Infantry Regiment (504th PIR). The 1st, 2nd and 3rd Battalions were constituted the same date as Companies A, B, and C, respectively, of the 504th PIR, and were activated on 1 May 1942 at Fort Benning, Georgia, and was assigned to the U.S. Army Airborne Command. When complete with its regimental training, the 504th, then under the command of Colonel Theodore L. Dunn, was assigned to the 82nd Airborne Division, commanded by Major General Matthew Ridgway, on 15 August 1942. Serving alongside the regiment in the 82nd were the 325th and 326th Glider Infantry Regiments, together with supporting units.

The 504th PIR, now under the command of 31-year-old Lieutenant Colonel Reuben Henry "Rube" Tucker, who had formerly been the 504th's executive officer (XO), soon moved from Fort Benning to Fort Bragg, North Carolina, on 30 September 1942 to finish its training, fill its Table of Organization and Equipment (TOE), and prepare for its staging call. When the call came, the regiment staged at Camp Edwards on 18 April 1943, and it made its port call on 10 May 1943, when it departed the New York Port of Embarkation (NYPOE).

=== North Africa ===
On 29 April 1943, the 504th boarded the troop ship USS George Washington which steamed to North Africa and the regiment's first overseas port of call, Casablanca. They arrived shortly before the end of the campaign in North Africa, which ended with the surrender of almost 250,000 Axis soldiers. Upon arrival the paratroops marched eight miles south of the city where they established a cantonment area consisting of a few stone huts and a tent city. Soon, the regiment was moved by "40 and 8's" northward to Oujda, Morocco. The "40 and 8's" were railroad cars dating from World War I, so called because they were designed to carry 40 men or 8 horses.

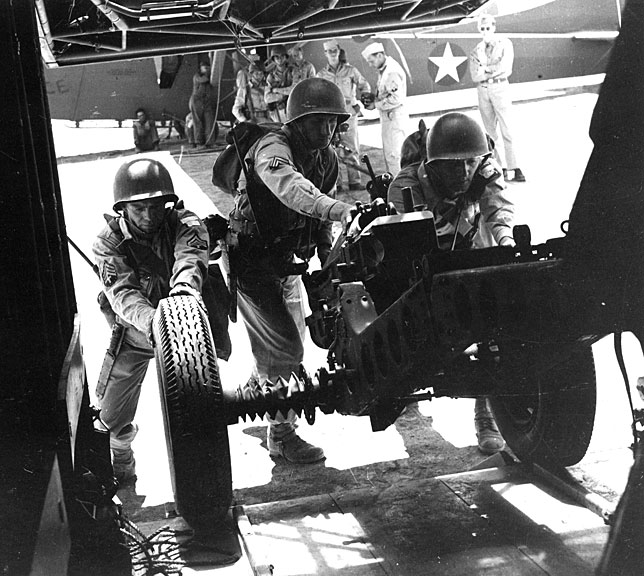
Men of the 504th prepare a 75 mm pack howitzer for stowage aboard a glider in April 1943.

Training intensified and senior officers such as General Eisenhower, the Supreme Allied Commander in the Mediterranean Theater of Operations (MTO), Lieutenant General Clark, the U.S. Fifth Army commander, and Lieutenant General Patton, the U.S. Seventh Army commander, along with the Sultan of Morocco and officials of every Allied nation watched the 504th go through its paces. Training included many practice jumps, and one conducted in winds of up to 30 miles-per-hour put nearly 30% of the unit in the hospital with broken bones, sprains and bruises. Finally, the order came and the 504th moved by truck to Kairouan, Tunisia, which was to be the 82nd Airborne Division's point of departure for the Allied invasion of Sicily.

=== Sicily, July 1943 ===
Colonel James M. Gavin, commander of the 505th Parachute Regimental Combat Team (with the 3rd Battalion of the 504th attached), led the 82nd Airborne Division during Operation Husky, and, on the night of 9 July 1943, the 504th helped spearhead the Allied invasion of Sicily in the first airborne military offensive in the history of the United States Army.

The paratroopers of the 504th crossed over the Sicilian coast on schedule. Despite extensive precautions to avoid an incident, near the Sicilian coast a nervous Allied naval vessel suddenly fired upon the formation. Immediately, all other naval vessels and shore troops joined in, downing friendly aircraft and forcing planeloads of paratroopers to exit far from their intended drop zones in one of the greatest friendly fire tragedies of World War II. However, U.S. Navy ships had been under intense Axis aerial attacks, and many were unaware of the impending jump. Twenty-three planes were destroyed, thirty-seven were damaged, and almost 400 casualties were confirmed.

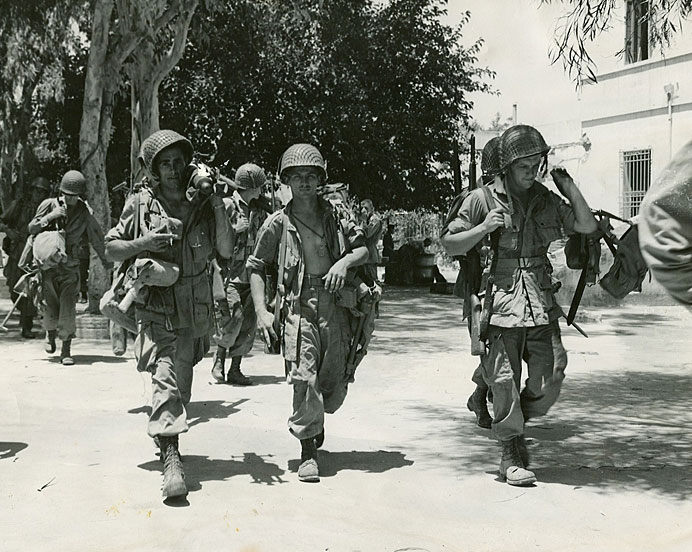
Men of the 504th Parachute Infantry Regiment patrolling in Sicily, July 1943.

Colonel Tucker's plane, after twice flying the length of the Sicilian coast and with well over 2,000 holes in its fuselage, finally reached the drop zone near Gela. By morning, only 400 of the rest of the regiment's 1,600 paratroopers had reached the objective area. The others had been dropped in isolated groups on all parts of the island and carried out demolitions, cut lines of communication, established island roadblocks, ambushed German and Italian motorized columns, and caused so much confusion over such an extensive area that initial German radio reports estimated the number of American parachutists dropped to be over ten times the actual number.

On 13 July 1943, the 504th Parachute Infantry moved out, spearheading the 82nd Airborne Division's drive northwest 150 miles (240 km) along the southern coast of Sicily. With captured Italian light tanks, trucks, motorcycles, horses, mules, bicycles, and even wheelbarrows pressed into service, the 82nd encountered only light resistance and took 22,000 POWs in their first contact with enemy forces. Overall, the Sicilian operation proved costly, both in lives and equipment, but the regiment gained valuable fighting experience and managed to hurt the enemy in the process. It was with this experience and pride that the 504th returned to its base in Kairouan to prepare for the invasion of mainland Italy.

=== Devils in Italy ===
Back in North Africa, replacements arrived, training resumed, and the 3rd Battalion was again detached, this time to Bizerte, for special beach assault training with the 325th Glider Infantry Regiment (325th GIR) and the Army Rangers. The 1st and 2nd Battalions moved back to Sicily and trained for a drop at Capua —in vain, however, because the enemy had been tipped off and was waiting on the drop zone. Another disappointment followed with the cancellation of the drop on Rome. Last minute intelligence disclosed that "negotiations" between Brigadier General Maxwell Taylor, commanding the 82nd Airborne Artillery, and Italian Marshal Pietro Badoglio were a trap. Finally, in early September, the 3rd Battalion rejoined the 325th GIR and the Rangers, boarded landing craft, and set out to sea. The men knew they were going to Italy, but little else. Troopers from H Company, with a group of Army Rangers, made the initial landing on 9 September 1943 on the Italian coast at Maiori. They quickly advanced inland to seize the Chiunzi Pass and a vital railroad tunnel.

On 11 September 1943, the 3rd Battalion Headquarters and G and I Companies, along with the remainder of the 325th GIR, swerved south and landed at Salerno. The military situation deteriorated with each passing hour as German tanks and infantry tried to push the Allies back into the sea. The 3rd Battalion troopers dug in and held on.

On standby at airfields in Sicily, the 1st and 2nd Battalions of the 504th were alerted, issued parachutes, and loaded on aircraft without knowledge of their destination. Receiving their briefing aboard the plane, the men were told that the U.S. Fifth Army's beachhead was in danger and they were needed to jump in behind friendly lines. Flying in columns of battalions, they exited over the barrels of gasoline-soaked sand that formed a flaming "T" in the center of the drop zone. The regiment assembled quickly and moved to the sounds of cannon and small arms fire within the hour. By dawn, the unit was firmly set in defensive positions.

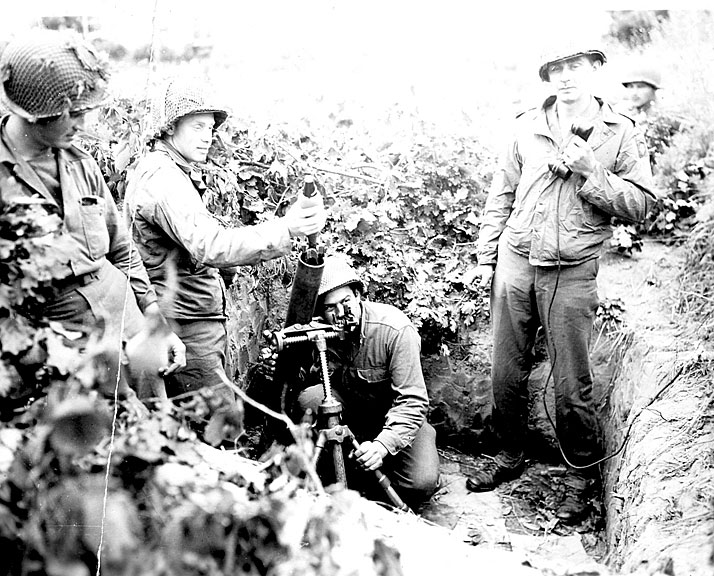
Men of the 504th Parachute Infantry Regiment prepare to fire an 81 mm mortar during the battle for Italy, September 1943.

The days that followed were, in the words of Lieutenant General Mark W. Clark, commander of the Fifth Army, "responsible for saving the Salerno beachhead." As the 504th (minus the 3rd Battalion) took the high ground at Altavilla, the enemy counterattacked, inflicting heavy casualties on the regiment, and the divisional commander, Major General Ridgway, along with Major General Fred L. Walker, commander of the 36th Infantry Division, suggested the unit withdraw. Epitomizing the determined spirit of the regiment, Colonel Tucker vehemently replied, "Hell no! We've got this hill and we are going to keep it. Just send me my other battalion." The 3rd Battalion, then being held in reserve, rejoined the rest of the 504th and, supported by a huge 350-round barrage from the Navy, repulsed the enemy, forcing the Germans to retreat from Salerno. Colonel Tucker and two of his men were awarded the Distinguished Service Cross for their actions at Altavilla.

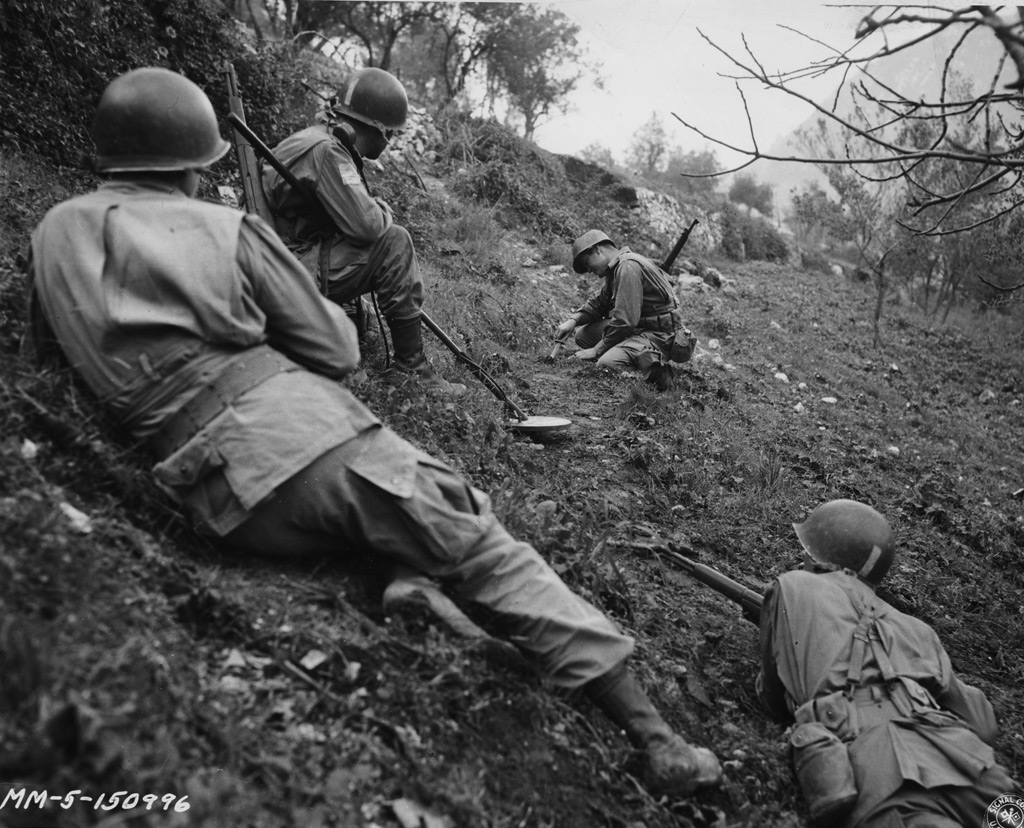
Men of the 504th Regimental Demolition Platoon keep a close eye while a demolitions expert searches for hidden S-mines on the slope of Hill 1017, November 1943.

The operation secured the flanks of the Fifth Army, allowing it to break out of the coastal plain and drive on to Naples. On 1 October 1943, the 504th became the first infantry unit to enter the city of Naples, which it subsequently garrisons, along with most of the rest of the 82nd Airborne Division. The airborne operation at Salerno was not only a success, but it also stands as one of history's greatest examples of the mobility of the airborne unit: within only eight hours of notification, the 504th developed and disseminated its tactical plan, prepared for combat, loaded aircraft and jumped onto its assigned drop zone to engage the enemy and turn the tide of battle.

The 82nd Airborne Division was slated as a unit to be used in the invasion of Normandy the following year. However, Lieutenant General Clark, the Fifth Army commander, was unwilling to give up the division. During the next few weeks in fighting Italy, the 504th, reinforced with the 376th and 456th Parachute Field Artillery Battalions to create the 504th Parachute Regimental Combat Team, fought in difficult terrain against a determined enemy. On steep, barren slopes, the regiment assaulted one hill after another. Mule trains aided in the evacuation of wounded to some extent, but casualties were often carried for hours down the steep hillsides just to reach the road.

Finally, the 504th, severely understrength, was pulled back to Naples on 4 January 1944 as rumors of another airborne mission spread. The operation was to be called Operation "Shingle", and it involved an airborne assault into a sector behind the coastal town of Anzio, 35 miles south of Rome. It seemed, however, that even the locals in Naples knew of the operation, so the 504th was glad that the beach would be assaulted from troop-carrying landing craft.

The landing on Red Beach went smoothly—at least until enemy planes started their strafing runs on the landing craft. The unit disembarked under fire and was sent shortly thereafter to patrol in force along the Mussolini Canal. After several days of intense German artillery fire, the enemy launched his main drive to push the Allies back into the sea. The 3rd Battalion was committed with elements of the British 1st Infantry Division in the heaviest fighting, with the paratrooper companies, due to the severe fighting, being reduced in strength to between 20 and 30 men. H Company drove forward to rescue a captured British General and was cut off. I Company broke through to them with their remaining 16 men. For its outstanding performance from 8 to 12 February 1944, the 3rd Battalion, 504th was presented one of the first Presidential Unit Citations awarded in the European Theater of Operations (ETO).

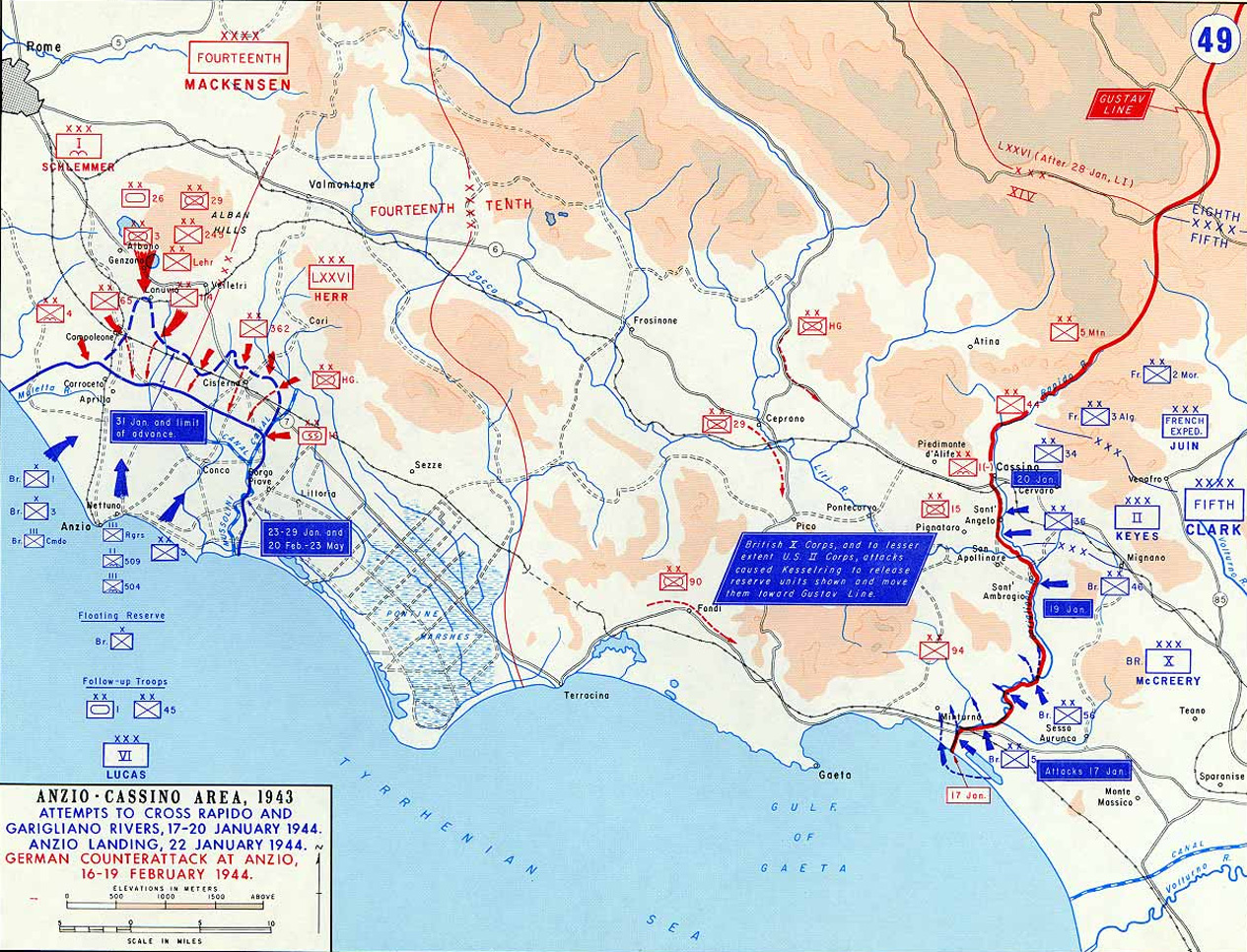
Force dispositions at Anzio and Cassino January/February 1944.

Private Ray E. Thiel, from Long Island, California, of the mortar platoon of the 3rd/504th, cleans an 81mm mortar. Cisterna area, Italy, March 8, 1944.

For the remainder of their eight-week stay in the Anzio beachhead, the men of the 504th found themselves fighting defensive battles instead of the offensive operations for which they were better suited and had been trained. For the first time the men were engaged in static trench warfare like that of World War I a generation before, with barbed wire entanglements and minefields in front and between alternate positions. It was during this battle that the 504th acquired the nickname "The Devils in Baggy Pants," taken from the following entry found in the diary of a Wehrmacht officer killed at Anzio:

"American parachutists...devils in baggy pants...are less than 100 meters from my outpost line. I can't sleep at night; they pop up from nowhere and we never know when or how they will strike next. Seems like the black-hearted devils are everywhere..."

On 23 March 1944, the 504th was pulled out of the beachhead by landing craft and returned to Naples. The campaign in Italy for the 504th had been costly, but enemy losses exceeded those of the regiment by over tenfold, and the Allies maintained control of the beachhead. Shortly thereafter, the 504th boarded the Cape Town Castle and steamed to England, arriving there on 22 April.

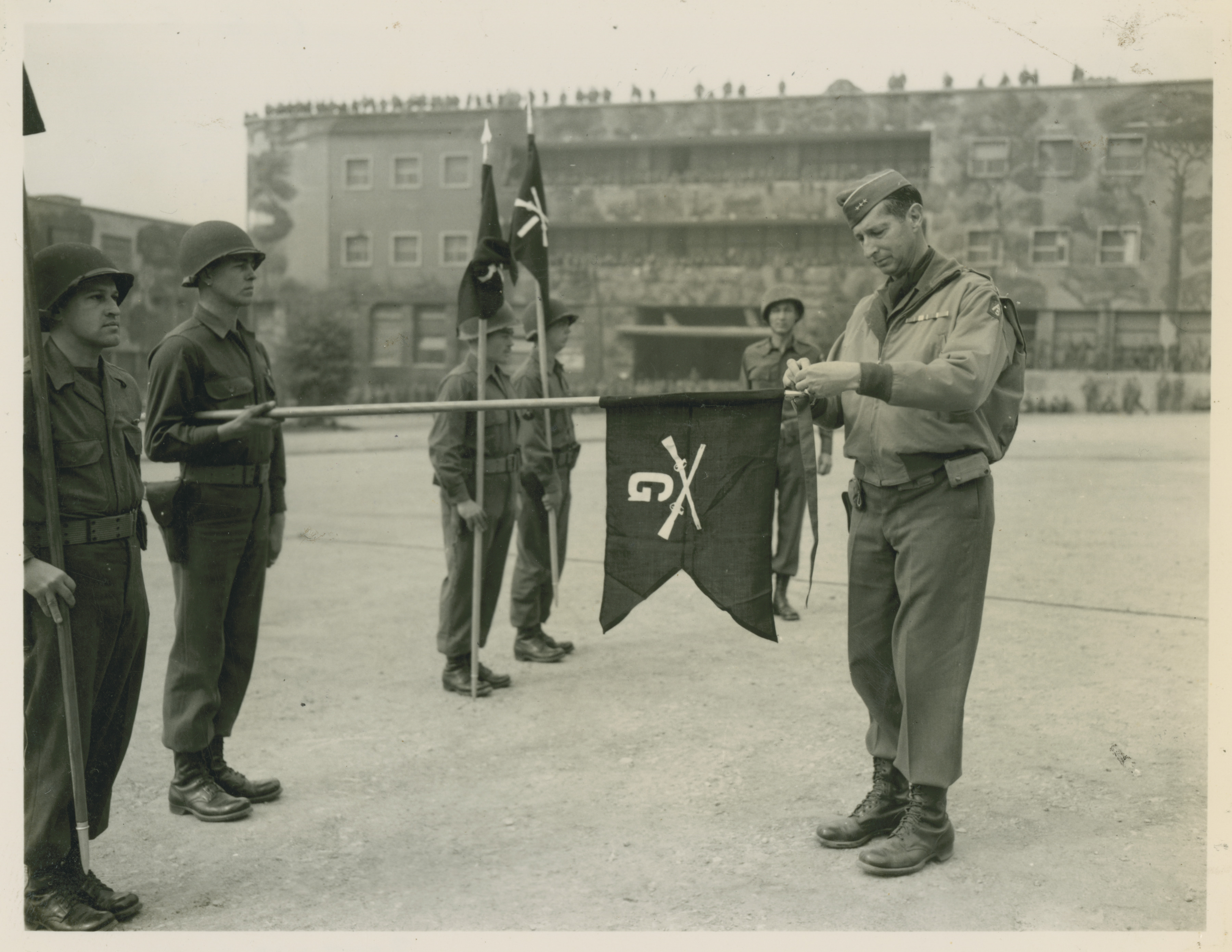
Lt. General Mark W. Clark pins a battle streamer on the guidon of Co. G, 3rd Battalion, 504th Parachute Infantry Regiment which is held by Pvt. Harold T. Williams, Long Beach, California, April 8, 1944.

The near-continuous fighting in Italy had cost the 504th dearly; just over 1,100 casualties were sustained. Just under 600 of these, or 25 percent, were suffered during the fighting at Anzio alone and two of three battalion commanders had become casualties.

=== From England to the Netherlands ===
Although Nazi broadcasters warned the 504th by radio that German submarines would never let the Cape Town Castle past the Straits of Gibraltar, the only danger the ship encountered came when all the troops rushed to the same side of the vessel as it pulled into Liverpool on 22 April 1944. The 82nd Airborne Division band greeted them with "We're All American and proud to be...," and it was assumed that the 504th would rejoin the 82nd for the upcoming invasion of Normandy, scheduled for early June. Yet, as D-Day approached, it became apparent that the 504th would be held back due to a lack of replacements. Brigadier General Gavin, the ADC, urged that the 504th be substituted for the two regiments that had joined the 82nd, the 507th and 508th, taking replacements from either of those units. However, Major General Ridgway, the division commander, vetoed the idea. Later, when Gavin sought volunteers to serve as pathfinders, around 29 men of the 504th came forward.

The 504th thus remained in England as "Dry Runs" came one after another. Missions were scheduled for France, Belgium, and the Netherlands and then canceled at the last moment. For three days the troopers waited for the fog to lift to allow them to drop into Belgium, but the wait proved long enough for Lieutenant General George Patton's U.S. Third Army to overrun the drop zones, thereby returning the 504th to its English garrison.

Therefore, when the word came on 15 September for the 82nd Airborne Division, now commanded by Brigadier General Gavin (thus making Gavin, aged just 37, the youngest divisional commander in the U.S. Army), to jump in ahead of the British Second Army, commanded by Lieutenant General Sir Miles C. Dempsey, 57 miles behind enemy lines in the vicinity of Grave, in the Netherlands, few believed the mission would actually be conducted. The operation would require seizing the longest bridge in Europe over the Meuse (Maas) and several other bridges over the Maas-Waal Canal. The men of the 504th became even more doubtful the mission would go when told that the planned flight was through the Scheldt Estuary (nicknamed "Flak Alley" by Allied bomber pilots) and that they were reportedly outnumbered by 4,000 of Hitler's Schutzstaffel (SS) troops and an unknown number of German tanks.

No cancellation was received, however, and on 17 September 1944 at 12:31 hours, the pathfinders of the 504th landed on the drop zone, followed thirty minutes later by the rest of the regiment and C Company of the 307th Airborne Engineer Battalion, to become the first Allied troops to land in the Netherlands as part of Operation Market Garden—the largest airborne operation in history. By 18:00 hours, the 504th had accomplished its assigned mission (although the enemy had managed to destroy one of the bridges). In just four hours, the regiment had jumped, assembled, engaged the enemy, and seized its objectives.

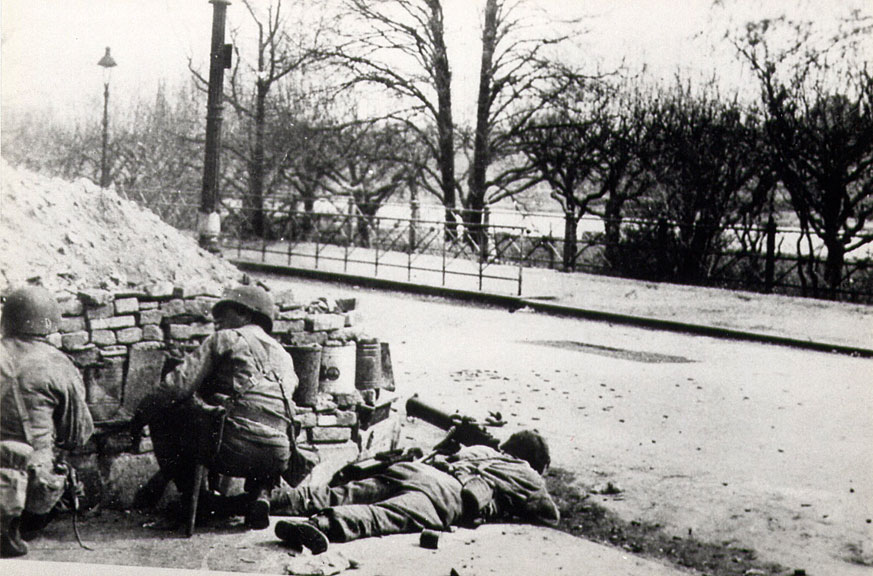
The 504th Parachute Infantry Regiment were some of the first Allied troops to land in the Netherlands as part of Operation Market Garden, the largest airborne operation in history.

For the next two days, the regiment held its ground and conducted aggressive combat and reconnaissance patrols until the 2nd Battalion of the Irish Guards, part of the 5th Guards Armoured Brigade of the Guards Armoured Division, made the ground link-up, spearheading the advance of the British 30th Corps, commanded by Lieutenant General Sir Brian G. Horrocks, of the British Second Army. However, the Nijmegen road and rail bridges, which were the last remaining link to the British 1st Airborne Division fighting in Arnhem, remained in enemy hands, and the far bank was heavily defended by the Germans. An assault crossing of the river was necessary, but it was a seemingly impossible task. Gavin intended to make a pre-dawn crossing after consulting with British Lieutenant General Horrocks and Lieutenant General Sir Frederick A. M. Browning, commander of the British 1st Airborne Corps (of which the 82nd formed a part), in the presence of senior officers of the Guards Armoured and 82nd Airborne Divisions, and Colonel Reuben Tucker of the 504th, and during the night he drew up a plan, and alerted the troops at 06:00 in the expectation of the boats to be provided by the British XXX Corps.

However, the crossing did not commence until 15:00 after the guns of the 376th Parachute Field Artillery Battalion and 153rd (Leicestershire Yeomanry) Field Regiment, Royal Artillery, and two troops of the Grenadier Guards Sherman tanks opened fire on the northern (Lent) bank. The British provided 26 canvas boats, each 19 feet (5.8 m) long, that the 504th used to cross the 400 yards (370 m)-wide river. The 3rd Battalion's H and I companies, and some engineers from the 307th Airborne Engineers crossed in the first wave, 15 men to a boat, and they were immediately on leaving the far shore the target of German 88 mm cannons, 20 mm cannons, flak wagons, machine guns and riflemen. Nonetheless, the crossing was launched. With only 2-4 oars in each boat, the remaining men rowed with the rifle butts. Only 13 boats made it across, and only 11 of those were in condition to return across the river to deliver succeeding waves.

The 1st Battalion formed the second wave, and they established a firm bridgehead from which the units carried the battle to the enemy defending the old Fort Belvedere and captured the bridge from the north side. Lieutenant General Dempsey, commander of the British Second Army, after witnessing the crossing, characterized the attack with a single word as he shook his head and said, simply, "Unbelievable." Six crossings were made by 1900. It was there that Dempsey, upon meeting Brigadier General Gavin, shook him by the hand and said "I am proud to meet the commander of the greatest division in the world today." Because only 11 boats returned from the first crossing, eight from the second and five from the third, A Company that followed used locally sourced wooden fishing boats.

=== France and Belgium, November 1944 ===
After remaining in the front-line for the next few weeks, on 16 November 1944, the 504th arrived at Camp Sissone near Rheims in Northern France on British lorries, greeted again by the traditional "We're All American..." of the 82nd band. Soon after, the 82nd moved to Camp Laon and began training with the new C-46 Commando aircraft, the first aircraft with two troop doors for parachute exits.

At 21:00 on the night of 17 December 1944, Colonel Tucker was summoned to the 82nd Airborne Division headquarters. There he learned that the Germans had broken through into Belgium and Luxembourg with a powerful armored thrust launched south of Aachen in what became known as the Battle of the Bulge.

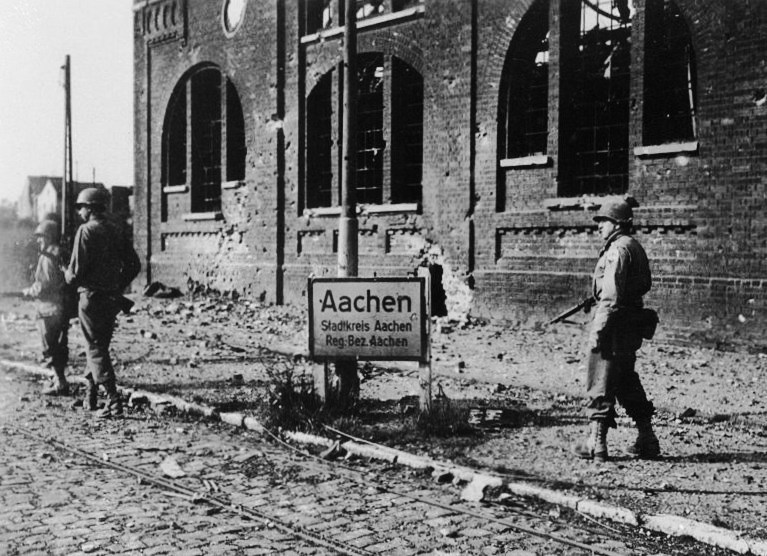
Men of the 504th PIR move through Aachen, Germany, the first large German city to be taken by the Allies.

The next morning the 504th paratroopers started for Bastogne, not in airplanes, but in large trucks. Along the way, their destination was changed to Werbomont—a point more seriously threatened. The Devils conducted a night movement on foot for eight miles to take up defensive positions. On 19 December Colonel Tucker was ordered to Rahier and Cheneux to link up with the 505th PIR at Trois Ponts. The 1st Battalion was ordered to take the towns Brume, Rhier, and Cheneux. At 14:00 on 20 December 1944, 1st Battalion (less A Company) moved out toward Cheneux, where it was immediately engaged by a battalion of the SS-Obersturmbannführer Joachim Peiper's Kampfgruppe Peiper of the I SS Panzer Corps. Crossing an open 400-yard field laced every fifteen yards with barbed wire, the 1st Battalion faced the heaviest enemy fire the 504th had ever encountered, including heavy machine-guns, a 20 mm gun, and a half-dozen German armored vehicles. Captain Jack M. Bartley was killed on 21 December 1944.

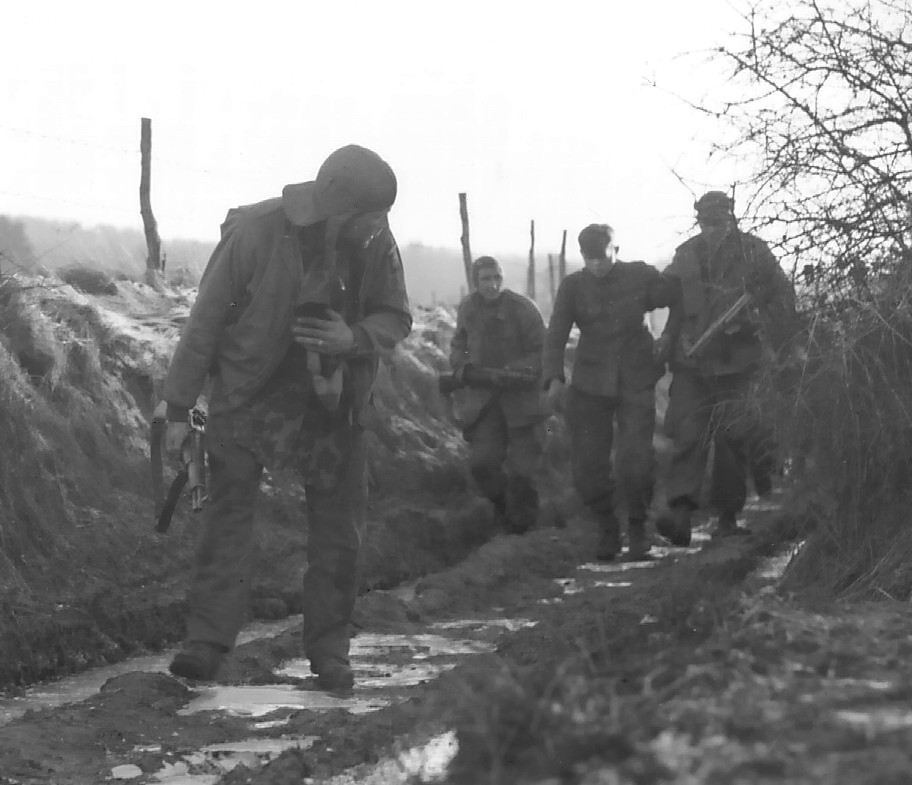
While digging in near Bra, soldiers of Company H of the 3rd Battalion, 504th, met SS troopers on reconnaissance. Several Germans were killed and one captured. 25 December 1944.

The 504th deployed a captured German halftrack armed with a 70 mm gun manned by two paratroopers with no training in its use. They were successful in knocking out several enemy positions. Still, the 504th took very heavy losses crossing the open field, and at 17:00 were ordered to withdraw 200 yards (180 m) to the edge of a wood. Colonel Tucker ordered the 1st Battalion to engage in an assault on the German forces in Cheneux that night. The Devils pressed forward, and by nightfall had given the Germans their first defeat of the Battle of the Bulge. Through heavy fire, Companies B and C wiped out an estimated five companies of German forces, as well as fourteen flak-wagons, six half-tracks, four trucks, and four 105 mm howitzers. However, the two companies were decimated, with 23 killed and 202 wounded; eighteen enlisted men remained in Company B, and thirty-eight men and three officers in Company C. Company A of the 1st Battalion, 504th, as well as the first platoon of Company C of the 307th Airborne Engineer Battalion, were awarded the Presidential Unit Citation for their outstanding performance during this action.

Throughout the initial days of battle with experienced German troops, the regiment wore down the enemy and discovered the Germans had only poorly organized and inadequately equipped follow-on forces. Soon thereafter, the paratroopers received the orders they had been expecting—to attack the Siegfried Line. The regiment was positioned on the right flank of the U.S. First Army, and on 28 January 1945 the 504th advanced through the Belgian forest of Büllingen in columns of two along a deep snowy trail, meeting only spotty resistance along the way.

While approaching Herresbach, the regiment encountered an enemy battalion in a head-on engagement that surprised both elements. The battle-wise paratroopers, without hesitation, accelerated their pace and moved on the enemy. The machine guns of the lead tank opened up on the Germans, while the men of the 504th fired their weapons from the hip at shooting-gallery speed. Within ten minutes, the enemy was overrun with more than 100 killed and 180 captured. Not a single 504th paratrooper was killed or wounded.

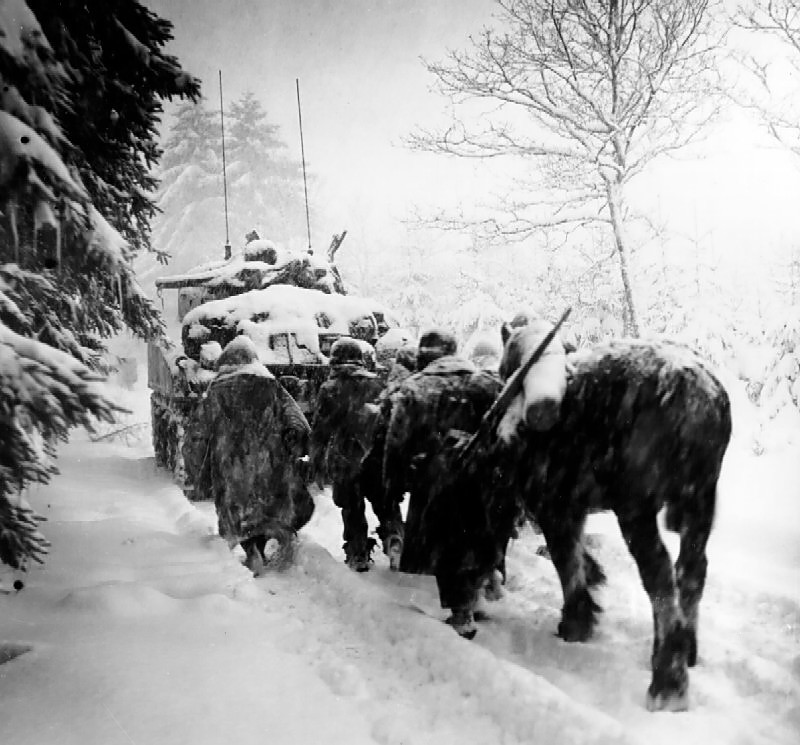
Troops of 340th Tank Battalion and Headquarters Company of the 3rd Battalion, 504th advance in a snowstorm behind a tank to attack Herresbach, Belgium. 28 January 1945.

Finally, on 1 February 1945, the order came to conduct the assault on the Siegfried Line through the Belgian Fort Gerolstein. The following day the 1st and 2nd Battalions jumped off on the attack. Moving cautiously from bunker to bunker, the troopers encountered heavy machine gun and small arms fire at all points. Ironically, the German Army's own Panzerfaust (a light anti-tank weapon with which the 504th was well equipped) was the regiment's most effective weapon against the German pillboxes. Despite the presence of thousands of mines and booby traps, only a small number of those disturbed actually detonated. Freezing temperatures, snow, ice and years of exposure had corroded the detonators. Vicious enemy counterattacks on 3 and 4 February were repulsed, and the unit was relieved. The regiment moved back to Grand Halleux where it spent several days before being trucked across the Belgian-German border. From Aachen, it moved by train back to Laon, France to await orders.

=== On to Berlin ===
Colonel Tucker and the advance detail left Laon on 1 April 1945 and traveled by jeep 270 miles to Cologne (Köln), Germany. Three days later the regiment arrived, mostly in "40 and 8s," and immediately took up positions along the west bank of the Rhine River. 504th patrols crossed nightly in small boats, engaging in brisk fire-fights almost every patrol. The enemy made a few attempts to cross to the regiment's side of the river, but all efforts were turned back.

On 6 April 1945, A Company crossed the Rhine at 02:30 hours and immediately made contact with the enemy. Under heavy fire and in a minefield, the first wave of 504th troopers was split into two elements, each of which fought its way independently to the predesignated objective. There they rejoined forces, knocked out several machine gun nests, and established a roadblock. Using similar tactics, succeeding waves infiltrated the enemy and set up a defense in the village of Hitdorf. For a short time, all was calm. Company A was awarded a Presidential Unit Citation for its action during this engagement.

Then the enemy counterattacked. The first counterattack was broken less than fifty yards from the perimeter, while the second was preceded by heavy artillery preparation. As enemy tanks and infantry closed in, the outnumbered and outgunned A Company fought its way back to the river's edge. The regiment sent I Company across to support the withdrawal. The 504th had lost only nine men to the enemy's 150, and 32 troopers were captured for 10 days and forced marched 100 km to Plettendorf, Germany then were liberated by elements of the 83rd Infantry Division. Whether the two companies achieved the higher aim of diverting enemy forces from a more important sector upstream is unknown. For the men involved, it was a small-scale "Dunkirk" with a hollow satisfaction achieved. The 504th was then relieved of its active defense of the Rhine and was directed to patrol the area north of Cologne until 1 May 1945. With little resistance to slow it down, the regiment established its command post in the town of Breetze, Germany on the west bank of the Elbe River. Although tanks had been attached to the unit, the 504th was outnumbered 100 to 1 by German troops clogging every road. Nevertheless, throughout the next several days, the Americans stood at 100-yard intervals collecting souvenirs by the jeep-load as almost never-ending columns of enemy forces poured through the regiment's lines to surrender.

At 10:00 hours on 3 May 1945, a jeep full of I Company men grew tired of waiting for a Russian element to link up with them, so they drove down the south side of the Elde and then twelve more miles to the town of Eldenburg. There they were entertained by a company of Cossacks, whose specific unit designation none of the men could recall after partaking of the various toasts offered in honor of Roosevelt, Churchill and Stalin.

The war officially ended in Europe on 8 May 1945. The 504th returned briefly to Nancy, France until the 82nd Airborne Division, the British 11th Armoured Division and the 5th Cossack Division were called upon to serve as the occupation forces in Berlin. Here the 82nd Airborne Division earned the name, "America's Guard of Honor," as a fitting end to hostilities in which the 504th had chased the German Army some 14,000 miles (23,000 km) across the European Theater.

Following their occupation duty with the 82nd Airborne Division in Berlin, the Devils reported to Fort Bragg, North Carolina.

== Post World War II service ==
=== Occupation and garrison ===
Following their occupation duty with the 82nd Airborne Division in Berlin, the Devils reported to Fort Bragg, North Carolina. The regiment remained at Fort Bragg until 1957, when the era of infantry regiments as tactical units ended and the Pentomic era began, in which designations were used to perpetuate lineages and honors. On 1 September of that year the lineage of Company A, 504 PIR was reorganized and redesignated as HHC, 1st Airborne Battle Group, 504th Infantry and remained assigned to the 82nd as one of five battle groups that replaced the three regiments previously assigned to the division. The lineage of Company B, 504 PIR was used to reflag existing elements of the 11th Airborne Division in Germany as HHC, 2nd Airborne Battle Group, 504th Infantry.

The 1st ABG, 504th Infantry remained assigned to the 82nd Airborne Division until 11 December 1958 when it rotated to Germany (along with 1-505th) to become part of the Airborne component of the newly reactivated 8th Infantry Division (Mechanized). Both 1-504th and 1-505th were replaced in the 82nd by 1-187th and 1-503rd, which rotated from the 24th Infantry Division in Germany to the 82nd. The colors of both remained with the 8th until the end of the Pentomic era, at which time (1 April 1963) they were reorganized and reflagged as 1st and 2nd battalions (Airborne), 509th Infantry, elements of the division's 1st Brigade (Airborne). The colors of 1-504th returned to the 82nd, and on 25 May 1963 they were reorganized and redesignated as 1st Battalion (Airborne), 504th Infantry, an element of the 1st Brigade, 82nd Airborne Division.

The 2nd ABG, 504th Infantry remained with the 11th Airborne Division in Germany only until 1 July 1959, when its colors were inactivated, and the unit was reflagged as a non-Airborne battle group and the division was reflagged as the 24th Infantry Division. The colors were relieved on 9 May 1960 from assignment to the inactive 11th Airborne Division and assigned to the 82nd Airborne Division and reactivated on 1 July 1960, and then reorganized and redesignated on 25 May 1964 as the 2nd Battalion (Airborne), 504th Infantry, joined 1-504th as an element of the 1st Brigade, 82nd Airborne Division.

=== Dominican Republic, April 1965 ===
On 26 April 1965, the 82nd Airborne Division received orders to prepare to deploy forces to the Dominican Republic. Two days earlier, a revolution had erupted in the Caribbean nation which put the safety of almost 3,000 American citizens in jeopardy. The initial deployment of 82nd Airborne soldiers came on 30 April 1965, and the two battalions of the 504th followed on 3 May 1965, landing at San Isidro Air Base to perform both military and humanitarian missions in support of Operation Power Pack. The 504th conducted military operations to help establish and maintain control of Santo Domingo and to provide security along the All American Expressway that ran through the city.

During these operations, the 504th was often subject to sniper fire and in repeated contact with enemy factions, as it contributed greatly to the establishment of security and to the distribution of food and medical supplies to those in need. Only five days after the arrival of the first U.S. forces, approximately 2,700 American citizens and 1,400 civilians from other nations were evacuated without injury. However, it became apparent that to restore stability to the Dominican Republic would require a continued U.S. presence, so the 504th remained as part of the Inter-American Peace Force for over a year, not returning to Fort Bragg until the summer of 1966.

U.S. troops were opposed by forces loyal to Juan Bosch, the Cuban/Soviet puppet president who was committed to spreading the totalitarian communist revolution to other island nations.

== Operation Golden Pheasant, Honduras 1988 ==
In March 1988, 1st and 2nd battalions, the 504th joined soldiers from the 7th Infantry Division (Light) at Fort Ord, California in a deployment to Honduras as part of Operation Golden Pheasant - The 7th ID was the first unit on the ground and went directly to protect the local population from attack by Cuban armed communist guerrillas - a deployment ordered by President Reagan in response to actions by the Cuban and Soviet-supported Nicaraguan Sandinistas that threatened the stability of Honduras' democratic government. On 17 March 1988, 1st Battalion and 2nd Battalion, 504th landed at Palmerola, a Honduran Air Force Base (now known as Soto Cano Air Base) that is the headquarters for the U.S. military presence in Honduras. 2nd Battalion jumped onto La Paz Drop Zone a day later, and the troopers of the 504th began rigorous training exercises with orders to avoid the fighting on the border. Had those orders changed, the Devils were prepared to fight, but the invading Sandinista troops had already begun to withdraw. In only a few days, the Sandinistan government negotiated a truce with Contra leaders, and by the end of March the paratroopers of the 504th had returned to Fort Bragg. 9808

== Parachutes in Panama, 1989 ==
On 20 December 1989, the 504th was again sent into battle as part of Operation Just Cause. The intent of this operation was to protect U.S. civilians in Panama, secure key facilities, neutralize both the Panamanian Defense Forces (PDF) and the "Dignity Battalions," and restore the elected government of Panama by ousting General Manuel Noriega. The 3-504 PIR had been prepositioned at Fort Sherman two weeks prior to the operation and was under the control of the 7th Infantry Division. The battalion conducted air and sea assaults in northern and central Panama to seize the dam that controlled the water in the Panama Canal, a prison, several police stations, several key bridges, a PDF supply point, the PDF demolitions school and an intelligence training facility. The operations were designed to neutralize the PDF while protecting U.S. nationals and the canal itself during the first few hours of the battle.

The 1-504 PIR and 2-504 PIR, along with the 4th Battalion, 325th Airborne Infantry Regiment (4-325 PIR) and the 1st Battalion, 75th Ranger Regiment (1/75 RGR), conducted a parachute assault on the Omar Torrijos International Airport. Following the airborne assault, the paratroopers soon found themselves engaged in fierce combat in urban and rural areas. As a testament to the discipline of the soldiers, however, the unit achieved all key objectives while causing only minimal collateral damage.

== Devils in the desert, 1990 ==
On 2 August 1990, the Iraqi Army (the world's fifth largest) attacked Kuwait. Paratroopers of the 82nd Airborne Division were quickly committed to Saudi Arabia and were positioned against an enemy that greatly outnumbered them. As diplomatic efforts failed, it became clear that the Iraqi Army would not withdraw. Plans were thus developed for Operation Desert Storm.

President Bush's warning to Iraqi President Saddam Hussein to withdraw from Kuwait by 15 January 1991 went unheeded and on 27 January 1991 the air war began. Allied sorties pounded the enemy for more than a month as the XVIII Airborne Corps made a rapid movement westward to position its units to roll up the flank of the multi-echeloned Iraqi defense. In a powerful offensive lasting only 100 hours, the Allied forces—with the 82nd on the far western flank—crossed into Iraqi territory, devastated the Iraqi Army and captured thousands of enemy soldiers. The dangerous task of clearing countless enemy bunkers was quickly completed by the 82nd troopers, and the 504th returned to Fort Bragg in April 1991.

== Hurricane Andrew, 1992 ==
In August 1992, 2nd Battalion, 504th PIR was alerted to deploy with a task force to the hurricane-ravaged area of South Florida to provide humanitarian assistance following Hurricane Andrew. For more than thirty days, the troopers provided the citizens with food, shelter and medical attention.

== Operation Uphold Democracy, Haiti 1994 ==
Demonstrating its readiness again in September 1994, the regiment was called upon to take part in Operation Uphold Democracy in Haiti. As the main effort of the 82nd Airborne Division, the 504th, along with 2nd Battalion, 325th Airborne Infantry Regiment, was tasked to conduct an airborne assault to seize Port-au-Prince International Airport and to secure key objectives in Port-au-Prince and the surrounding area to oust Raoul Cédras from power, reinstating Jean Bertrand Aristide as president. Several months of rigorous training had been conducted prior to the invasion. Less than three hours from drop time, however, the mission was terminated, and the aircraft returned with the 82nd units to Pope Air Force Base.

== Global War on Terror (Operations Enduring Freedom, Iraqi Freedom, and Freedom's Sentinel) ==
In July 2002, 1-504 PIR deployed to Afghanistan with the Task Force (TF) Panther (3rd Brigade, 82nd Airborne Division) in support of Operation Enduring Freedom. Areas of operation included Kandahar, Bagram Air Base, FOB Shkin, FOB Salerno, FOB Asadabad, and others. In December 2002 to January 2003, TF Devil (1st Brigade, 82nd Airborne Division), including both 2-504 PIR and 3-504 PIR replaced TF Panther. In January 2003, 2-504 PIR was operating from FOB Panther, Dora, Baghdad, while the 3-504 PIR was operating from Kandahar Air Base, Afghanistan in support of Operation Enduring Freedom.

The 1-504 PIR deployed again with TF Panther in September 2003 to Iraq in support of Operation Iraqi Freedom. Areas of Operation included FOB Mercury, Fallujah, Abu Ghraib (surrounding environs) and al Karma. In January 2004, TF Devil deployed to Iraq with 2-504 PIR and 3-504 PIR. The 2-504 PIR conducted operations in southern Baghdad, while most of 3-504 PIR conducted security of Balad Air Base, and Company C, 3-504 PIR conducted security of Cedar II near Talil Air Base.

In July 2005, 2-504 PIR was operating in Afghanistan close to the Pakistan border. In October 2005, 1st Battalion, 504 Parachute Infantry Regiment "Red Devils" deployed to Kurdistan in Northern Iraq in order to establish and run a maximum-security detention facility for high-risk detainees.

In September 2005, 3-504 deployed to Iraq to assist in providing security for the upcoming elections. The Blue Devils operated throughout the Al Anbar Province along the Euphrates River, in or near the cities of Haqlaniyah, Ramadi and Al Qaim. After the elections were complete the battalion was attached to USASOC in what was the first ever pairing of a battalion sized infantry unit to a USASOC task force and the beginning of the "Torch Mission." The battalion conducted combat operations in and around Ramadi in support of task force objectives. The Blue Devils redeployed to Ft Bragg in late January 2006. Five paratroopers were killed in action during this deployment. In June 2006 the battalion was reflagged as the 1st of the 508th Parachute Infantry Regiment in the newly formed Fourth Brigade of the division.

The 1-504 PIR with only one weeks' notice, deployed again in January 2007 to Baghdad as part of the surge and continued operations in Baghdad for 15 months.

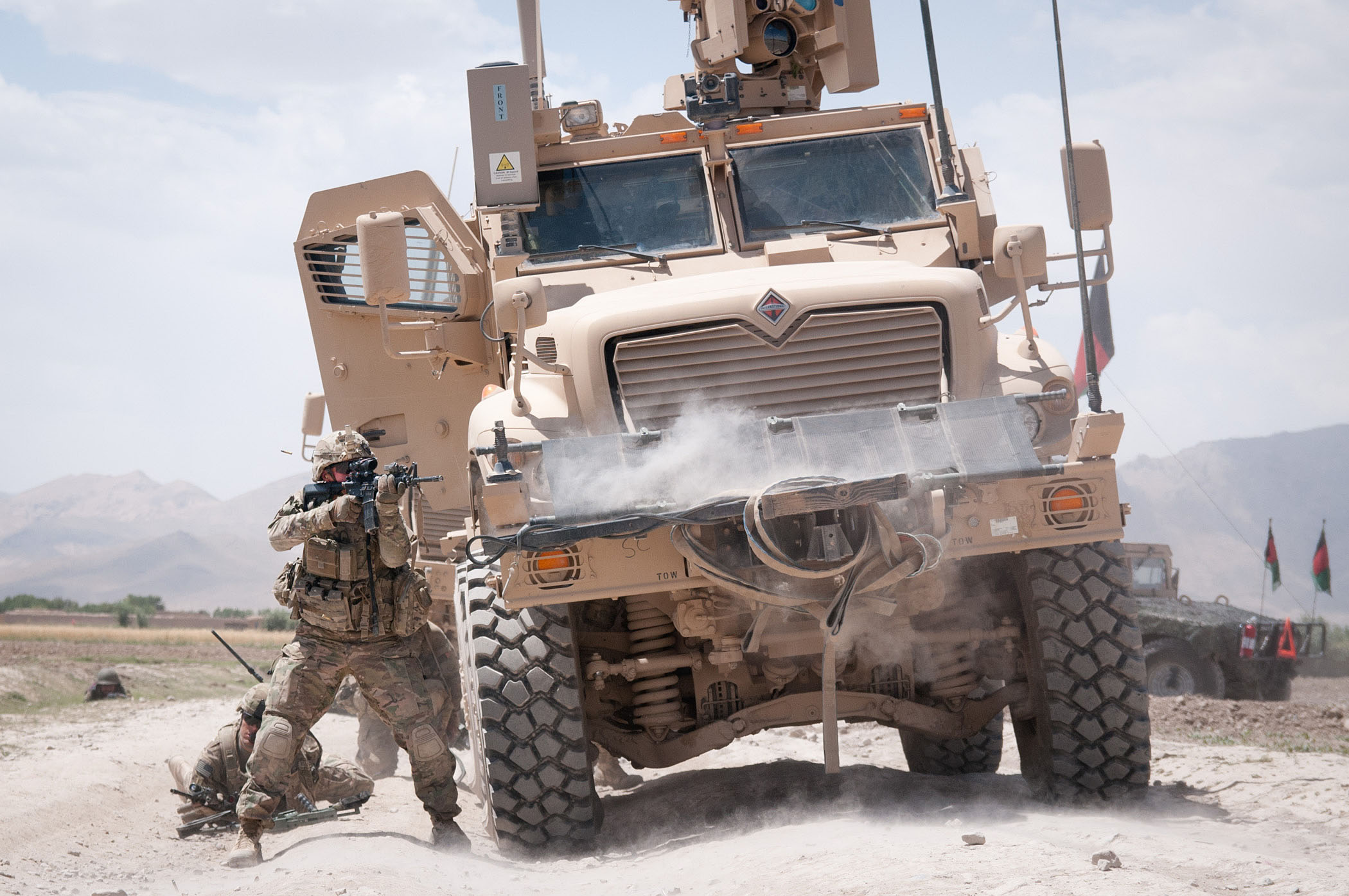
A U.S. Army paratrooper with the 82nd Airborne Division's 1st Brigade Combat Team fires at insurgents during a firefight 30 June 2012, Ghazni Province, Afghanistan.

The 1st Brigade Combat Team, 82nd Airborne Division, minus the 1st Battalion, 504th PIR, deployed to Iraq in June 2007 and the Brigade (-) conducted operations in Southern Iraq for 14 months based at Talil Air Base and several smaller locations. The 2nd Battalion, 504th PIR, initially deployed to Al Asad Airbase and conducted area security operations until January 2008 when they joined the BCT at Talil Air Base to replace the Australian Battle Group. They conducted major operations in Basra and Al Amarah, Iraq until July 2008.

The 1st Brigade Combat Team, including both 1st and 2nd battalions of the 504th PIR, deployed again to Al Anbar Province, Iraq, in August 2009 as the first Advise and Assist Brigade (AAB) in support of Operation Iraqi Freedom and redeployed in late July 2010. During the deployment, they trained and supported Iraqi Security Forces, helping to make the second national elections a success in Anbar, with few injuries and no loss of life. They also conducted parachute training jumps out of Al Asad Airbase.

Roughly 2,500 of the 3,500-strong 1st Brigade Combat Team deployed to Afghanistan from March to September 2012 to spearhead the last major clearing operation of the war, fighting insurgent forces in southern Ghazni Province. The brigade conducted nearly 3,500 patrols, killed or captured 400 enemy combatants, found nearly 200 roadside bombs and weapons caches, and engaged the enemy over 170 times. Seven paratroopers were killed in action, including two with 1-504 PIR and two with 2-504 PIR.

In February 2014 1-504 and 2-504 again deployed to Afghanistan. Most of 1-504 were stationed in Bagram Air Base as the Theatre Reserve Force for all of RC East. While A-1-504 & C-1-504 were in FOB Ghazni conducting clearing operations and FOB defense patrols to disrupt Taliban forces while the retrograde was in full swing. 2-504 was in Kandahar Air Base providing Theatre Reserve Force for RC South and conducting security operations in RC West. 2 paratroopers from 1-504 were killed, with several others wounded. They re-deployed to Fort Bragg in November 2014.

During the summer of 2017, 2-504 deployed to Afghanistan in support of Operation Freedom's Sentinel. In September 2017, they were joined by 1–504 as part of an increase in U.S. troop levels. Both battalions redeployed to Fort Bragg in March 2018.

On New Year's Eve 2019, the Immediate Response Force was activated in response to the global unrest with Iran. The 2-504 "White Devils" were alerted, marshaled and deployed within 18 hours upholding the 82nd Airborne's lasting motto. Eventually all of the Devil Brigade was alerted and deployed to the CENTCOM AOR to include portions of Kuwait and Iraq. The 2-504 was redeployed back to the United States after two month, meanwhile the 1-504 was once again alerted to push into Iraq after militants fired upon coalition base Camp Taji. Eventually the entire Devil Brigade would be redeployed back to Ft Bragg in May to June 2020.

On August 12, 2021, the Devil Brigade was activated once more as the Immediate Response Force to mobilize in support of Operation Allies Refuge, a noncombatant evacuation operation supporting the safe evacuation of vulnerable Afghan civilians, U.S. embassy employees, and prospective Special Immigrant Visa (SIV) applicants, out of Hamid Karzai International Airport, in Kabul, Afghanistan. During this operation, their efforts led to the safe evacuation of over 117,000 personnel and NATO allied forces administered a successful strike that neutralized two senior ISIS-K leaders in response to an ISIS-K attack that resulted with 11 U.S. Marines, 1 U.S. Sailor, and 1 U.S. Soldier being killed at the Abbey Gate by a suicide bomber on August 26, 2021.

== Regimental Lineage ==
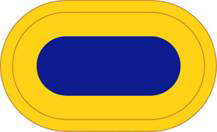
504th PIR background trimming

504th PIR Beret Flash

Constituted 24 February 1942 in the Army of the United States as the 504th Parachute Infantry

- Activated 1 May 1942 at Fort Benning, Georgia
- Assigned 15 August 1942 to the 82nd Airborne Division
- Reorganized and redesignated 15 December 1947 as the 504th Airborne Infantry
- Allotted 15 November 1948 to the Regular Army.
- Relieved 1 September 1957 from assignment to the 82nd Airborne Division; concurrently reorganized and redesignated as the 504th Infantry Regiment, a parent regiment under the Combat Arms Regimental System (CARS).
- Withdrawn 1 May 1986 from the Combat Arms Regimental System and reorganized under the U.S. Army Regimental System (USARS).

=== Current Battalions ===
==== First Battalion ====
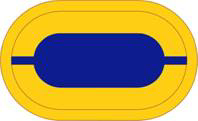
1/504th PIR background trimming

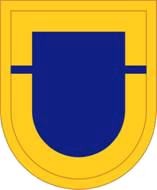
1/504th PIR Beret Flash
- Reorganized and redesignated 15 December 1947 as Company A, 504th Parachute Infantry Regiment.
- Allotted 15 November 1948 to the Regular Army
- Reorganized and redesignated 1 September 1957 as Headquarters and Headquarters Company, 1st Airborne Battle Group, 504th Infantry, and remained assigned to the 82d Airborne Division (organic elements concurrently constituted and activated)
- Relieved 11 December 1958 from assignment to the 82nd Airborne Division and assigned to the 8th Infantry Division
- Relieved 1 April 1963 from assignment to the 8th Infantry Division and assigned to the 82nd Airborne Division
- Reorganized and redesignated 25 May 1964 as the 1st Battalion, 504th Infantry.
- Known as the "Red Devils."

==== Second Battalion ====
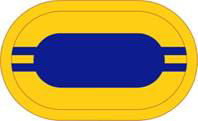
2/504th PIR background trimming

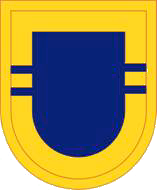
2/504th PIR Beret Flash
- Reorganized and redesignated 15 December 1947 as Company B, 504th Parachute Infantry Regiment.
- Allotted 15 November 1948 to the Regular Army.
- Reorganized and redesignated 1 March 1957 as Headquarters and Headquarters Company, 2nd Airborne Battle Group, 504th Infantry, relieved from assignment to the 82nd Airborne Division, and assigned to the 11th Airborne Division (organic elements concurrently constituted and activated).
- Inactivated 1 July 1958 in Germany.
- Relieved 9 May 1960 from assignment to the 11th Airborne Division and assigned to the 82nd Airborne Division.
- Activated 1 July 1960 at Fort Bragg, North Carolina.
- Reorganized and redesignated 25 May 1964 as the 2nd Battalion, 504th Infantry.
- Known as the "White Devils."

=== Former Battalions ===
==== Third Battalion ====
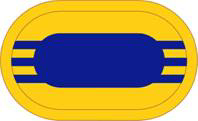
3/504th PIR background trimming

3/504th PIR Beret Flash
- Reorganized and redesignated 15 December 1947 as Company C, 504th Parachute Infantry Regiment.
- Allotted 15 November 1948 to the Regular Army.
- Inactivated 1 September 1957 at Fort Bragg, North Carolina, and relieved from assignment to the 82d Airborne Division; concurrently redesignated as Headquarters and Headquarters Company, 3d Airborne Battle Group, 504th Infantry.
- Redesignated 3 July 1968 as Headquarters and Headquarters Company, 3d Battalion, 504th Infantry (organic elements concurrently constituted).
- Assigned 15 July 1968 to the 82d Airborne Division and activated at Fort Bragg, North Carolina.

(The battalion was part of the 4th Brigade, temporarily activated when the 3rd Brigade was sent to Viet Nam. Units of the division's 4th Brigade remained in skeletal status, never being fully manned, and were inactivated upon the return of the 3rd Brigade from Viet Nam.)

- Inactivated 15 December 1969 at Fort Bragg, North Carolina, and relieved from assignment to the 82d Airborne Division.
- Assigned 1 May 1986 to the 82d Airborne Division and activated at Fort Bragg, North Carolina.
- The Blue Devils deployed as a contingency force to OIF from Sep 2005 to Jan 2006 under the command of LTC Larry Swift. Acknowledged by only a handful in the 82d Airborne Division, during this deployment 3-504 started the famed "Torch Mission": the enduring attachment of an infantry battalion to USASOC for missions.
- Inactivated June 2006 at Fort Bragg, North Carolina, and relieved from assignment to the 82d Airborne Division; concurrently reflagged as 1st Battalion, 508th Infantry Regiment.
- Reactivated January 2026 at Bavaria, Germany and assigned to the 173rd Airborne Brigade; reflagged from 1st Squadron, 91st Cavalry Regiment.
- Known as the "Blue Devils."

== Decorations ==
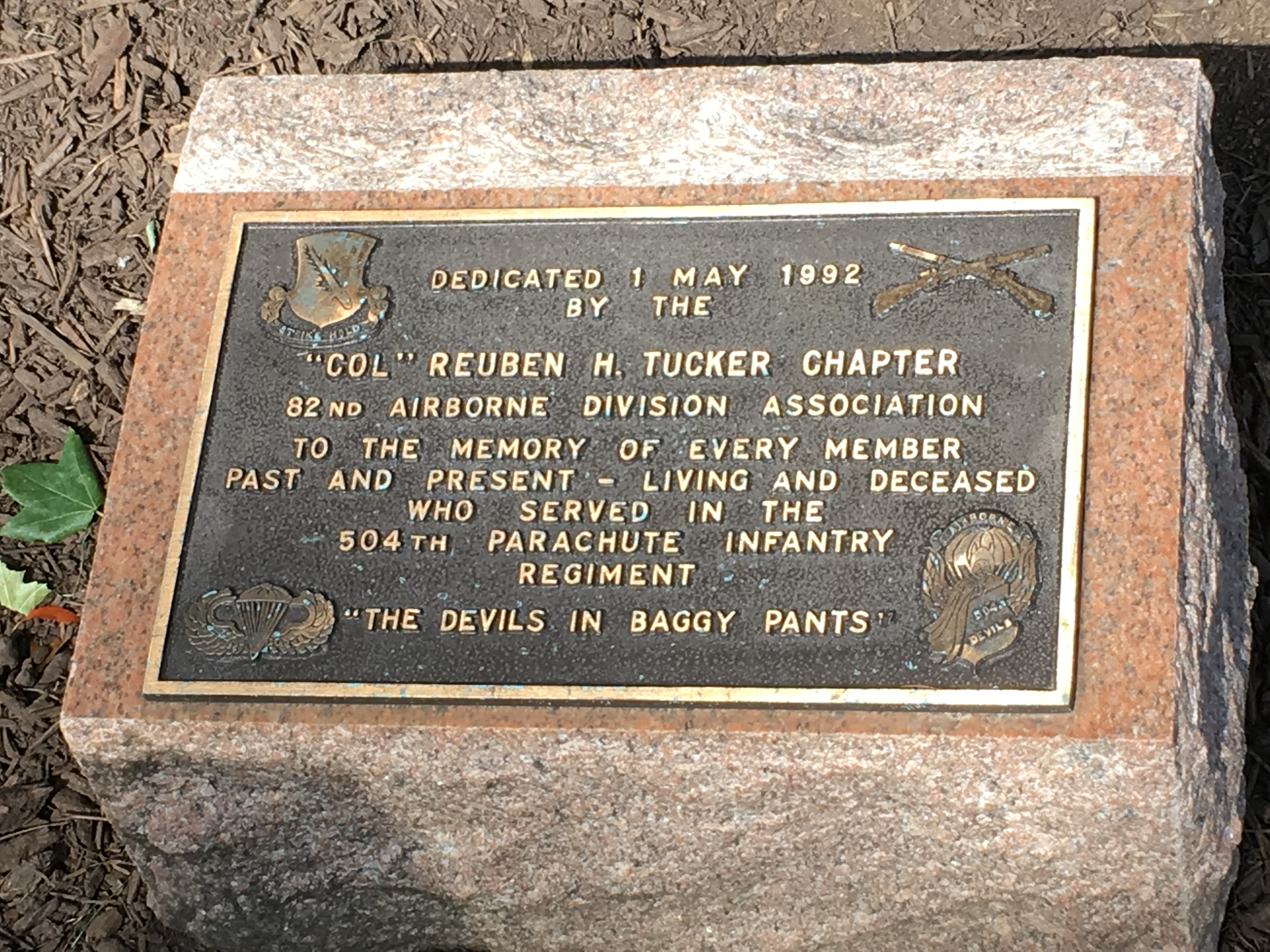
504th Infantry Regiment plaque at Arlington National Cemetery

- Belgian Fourragere 1940
- Presidential Unit Citation for Anzio
- Presidential Unit Citation for Operation Market Garden at Nijmegen, Netherlands
- Presidential Unit Citation for Cheneux, Belgium
- Presidential Unit Citation for HKIA Evacuation
- Military Order of William for Nijmegen 1944
- Netherlands Orange Lanyard
- Cited in the Order of the Day of the Belgian Army for action in the Ardennes Offensive
- Cited in the Order of the Day of the Belgian Army for action in Belgium and Germany
- Meritorious Unit Commendation (Army) for Southwest Asia
- Valorous Unit Award for Operation Enduring Freedom 2003
- Army Superior Unit Award 1996
- Valorous Unit Award (Army) For Combat Operations during the Baghdad Surge, 2008
- Meritorious Unit Commendation (Army) For successful completion of mission as first advise and assist brigade in Ramadi Iraq, 2010
- Meritorious Unit Commendation (Army) For Combat Operations in Afghanistan, 2017

== Notable commanders ==
- COL Reuben Henry Tucker III 1 December 1942 – 10 May 1946
- LTC William Westmoreland 21 July 1946 – 12 August 1947
- COL David A. Bramlett 7 January 1983 – 21 October 1983
- COL Henry H. Shelton 21 October 1983 – 22 October 1985
- COL William M. Steele 22 October 1985 – 22 October 1987
- COL Jack P. Nix Jr. 28 September 1989 – 6 September 1991
- COL John Abizaid 21 September 1993 – 12 June 1995
- COL David Petraeus 12 June 1995 – 3 June 1997
- COL Leo A. Brooks Jr. 22 June 1999 – 31 May 2001
- COL John F. Campbell 31 May 2001 - 24 July 2003
- COL Patrick J. Donahue II 2003 - 2006
- COL Charles A. Flynn, 2006 - 2008
- COL Mark R. Stammer, 2008 - 2010
- COL Mark Stock, 2010 - 2012
- COL Trevor Bredenkamp, 2012 - 2015
- COL Andrew Saslav, -2019-2021
- COL Theodore W. Kleisner II, 2021–2023
- COL Jason P. Schuerger, 2023–Present

== Notable former members ==
- Jimmy Goins, Vietnam War
- Jack Reed, U.S. Senator from Rhode Island
- James Megellas, World War II

== In popular culture ==
- Vito Scaletta served in the 504th parachute infantry Regiment during Allied invasion of Sicily in Mafia II.
