= 376th Parachute Field Artillery Battalion =

The 376th Parachute Field Artillery Battalion (376th PFAB) (later redesignated the 376th Airborne Field Artillery Battalion) is an inactive airborne field artillery battalion of the United States Army. Active with the 82nd Airborne Division from 1942–1957, the 376th PFAB saw action during World War II in Sicily, Italy, the Netherlands, the Battle of the Bulge, and Germany, often serving in support of the 504th Parachute Infantry Regimental Combat Team.

== History ==
The 376th PFAB was activated using cadre from the Parachute Test Battery. The initial battalion commander was Major Paul Wright. The battalion was composed of five batteries: Headquarters Battery, three firing batteries (Batteries A, B, and C) each of four 75mm pack howitzers, and Battery D, an antiaircraft/antitank battery with 37 mm antitank guns and .50 caliber machine guns. In October 1942, Major Wright left to take command of the 320th Glider Field Artillery Battalion, and Captain Robert Neptune assumed command. In January 1943, Major Wilbur Griffith assumed command, and now-Major Neptune returned to his duties as battalion executive officer. In April 1943, the battalion departed Fort Bragg, and staged at Camp Edwards, Massachusetts, before departing the New York Port of Embarkation on the George Washington. The battalion arrived at Casablanca on 10 May 1943, and staged there briefly before moving to Oujda, French Morocco. There, the battalion, the 504th Regimental Combat Team, and the 82nd Airborne Division trained in miserable conditions until before moving to Kairouan, Tunisia, on 1–2 July.

En route from North Africa to Sicily with the 504th PIR on 11 July 1943, the battalion suffered heavy losses when its aircraft were hit by friendly fire from American shipboard antiaircraft guns, with 24 men killed and 11 missing.

== Lineage and honors ==
=== Lineage ===
- Constituted 15 August 1942 in the Army of the United States as the 376th Parachute Field Artillery Battalion and assigned to the 82nd Airborne Division
- Activated 16 August 1942 at Camp Claiborne, Louisiana
- Redesignated 15 December 1947 as the 376th Airborne Field Artillery Battalion
- Allotted 15 November 1948 to the Regular Army
- Inactivated 1 September 1957 at Fort Bragg, North Carolina

=== Campaign participation credits ===
World War II

- Sicily (with arrowhead device)
- Naples-Foggia
- Anzio
- Rome-Arno
- Rhineland (with arrowhead device)
- Ardennes-Alsace
- Central Europe

=== Decorations ===
- Netherlands Military Order of William (Degree of the Knight of the Fourth Class), streamer embroidered NIJMEGEN 1944
- Netherlands Orange Lanyard
- Belgian Fourragere 1940
  - Cited in the Order of the Day of the Belgian Army for action in the Ardennes
  - Cited in the Order of the Day of the Belgian Army for action in Belgium and Germany

== Heraldry ==
=== Distinctive unit insignia ===
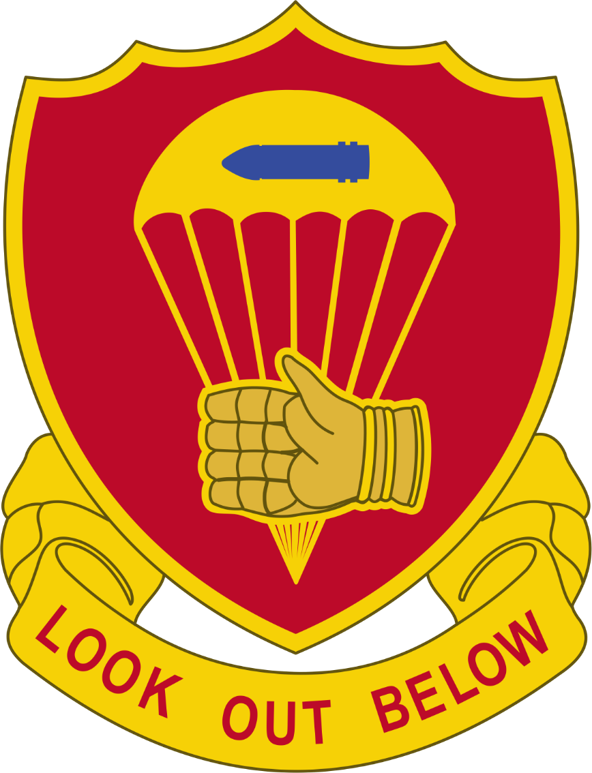

- Description/Blazon: A Gold color metal and enamel device 1 1/8 inches (2.86 cm) in height overall consisting of a shield blazoned: Gules an open parachute Or, charged with a projectile fesswise Azure; upon the umbrella's cords a dexter clenched gauntlet, thumb to chief of the second. Attached below and to the sides of the shield a Gold scroll inscribed "LOOK OUT BELOW" in Red letters.
- Symbolism: The scarlet is for the Field Artillery. The open parachute alludes to the functions of the Battalion; the blue projectile to the caliber of the organization's fire. The strong right hand of the personnel is representative of their trustworthiness. The motto is in the nature of a warning to enemy objectives.
- Background: The distinctive unit insignia was originally approved for the 376th Parachute Field Artillery Battalion on 22 January 1943. It was redesignated for the 376th Airborne Field Artillery Battalion on 14 July 1952.

=== Coat of arms ===
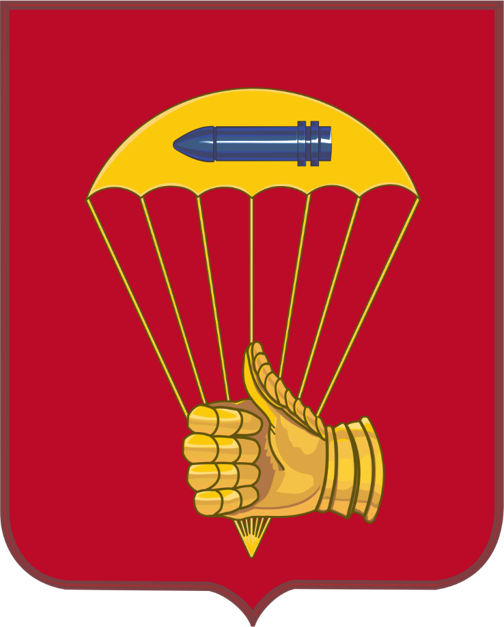

- Description/Blazon
  - Shield: Gules an open parachute Or, charged with a projectile fesswise Axure; upon the umbrella's cords a dexter clenched gauntlet, thumb to chief of the second
  - Crest: None
  - Motto: LOOK OUT BELOW
