= Reuben Henry Tucker III =

United States Army general (1911–1970)

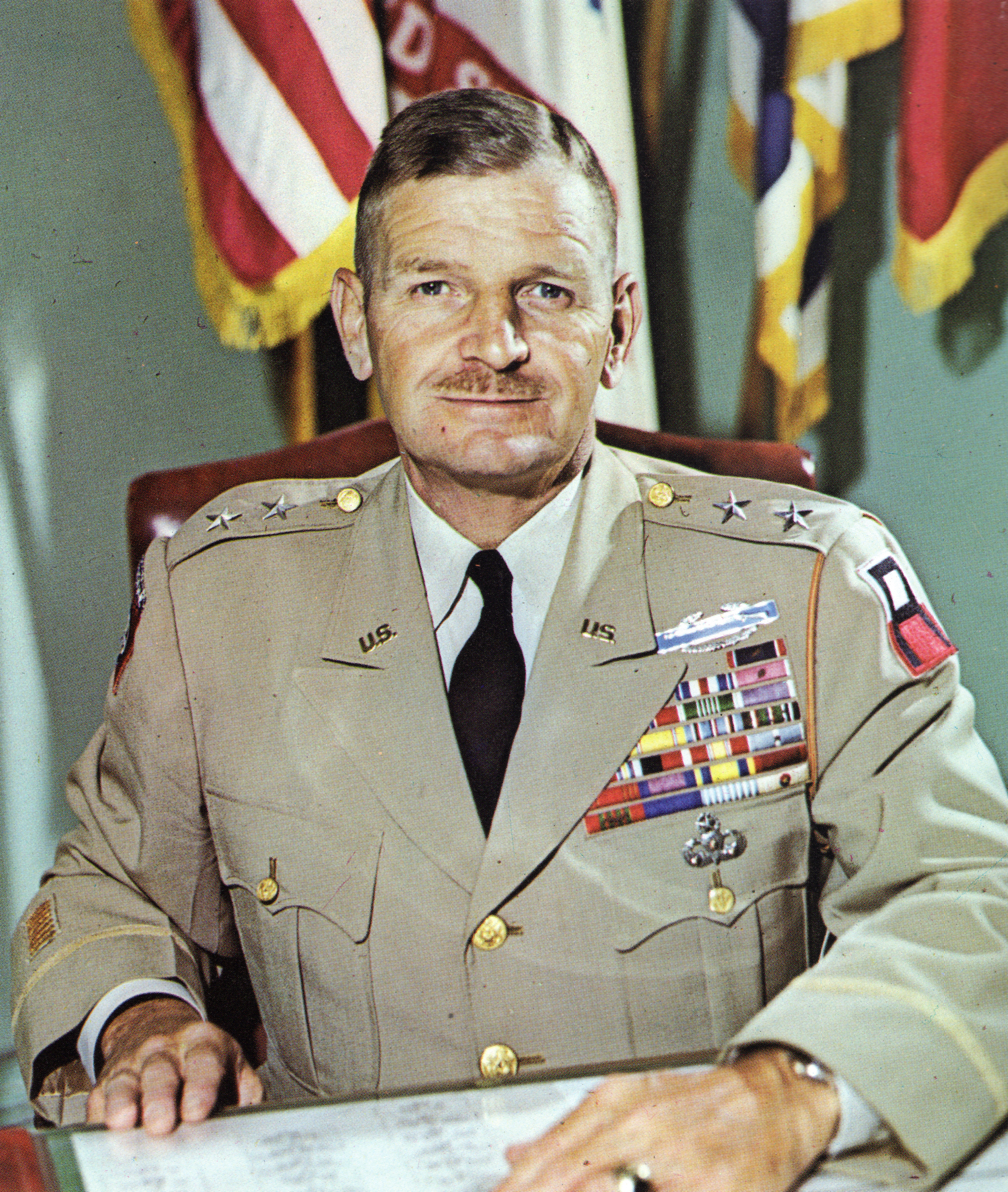
- Tucker as Commanding General of Fort Dix c. March 1962
- Born: January 29, 1911; Ansonia, Connecticut, United States
- Died: January 6, 1970 (aged 58); Charleston, South Carolina, United States
- Burial place: Beaufort National Cemetery, South Carolina, United States
- Military career
- Allegiance: United States
- Branch: United States Army
- Service years: 1930–1963
- Rank: Major General
- Nicknames: "Rube" “Tommy”
- Service number: 0-19894
- Unit: Infantry Branch
- Commands: Fort Dix; 504th Parachute Infantry Regiment
- Conflicts: World War II; Italian campaign; Allied invasion of Sicily; Allied invasion of Italy; Battle of Anzio; Western Front; Operation Market Garden; Battle of the Bulge; Western Allied invasion of Germany
- Awards: Distinguished Service Cross (2); Army Distinguished Service Medal; Silver Star; Legion of Merit (2); Bronze Star Medal; Purple Heart; Commendation Medal; Knight 4th Class of the Military Order of William (Netherlands); Order of the Patriotic War Second Class (Union of Soviet Socialist Republics)

Signature
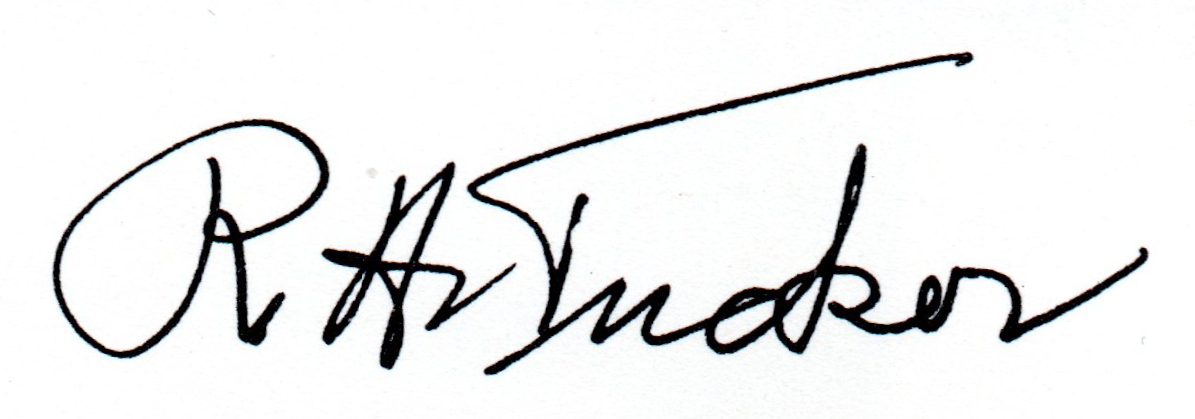

Major General Reuben Henry Tucker III (January 29, 1911 – January 6, 1970) was a highly decorated senior officer in the United States Army. He served with distinction during World War II, where he commanded the 504th Parachute Infantry Regiment in Sicily, Italy, The Netherlands, Belgium and Germany from 1942 to 1945. He was one of the youngest regimental commanders of the war.

== Early life ==
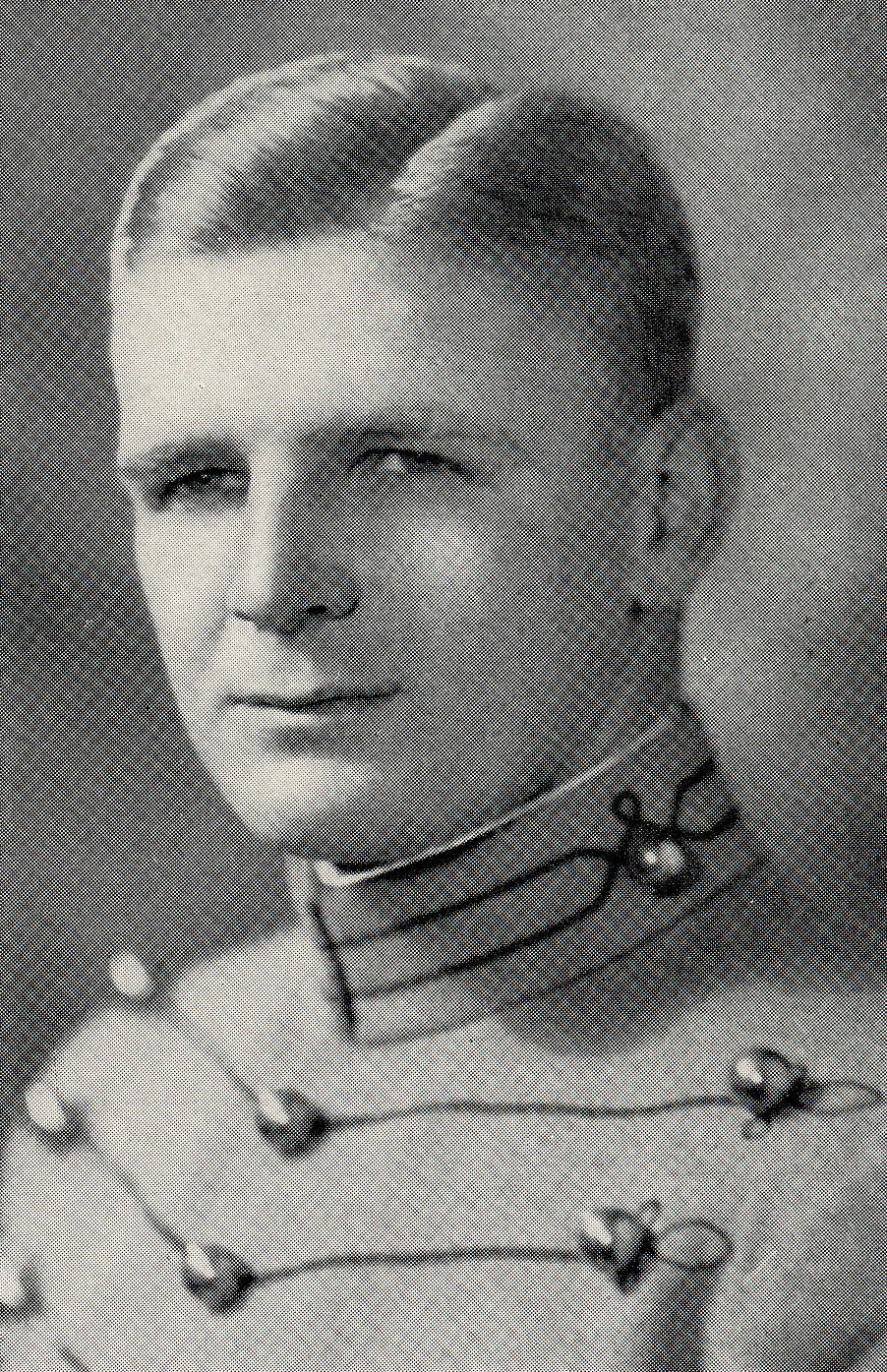
Tucker as a West Point cadet in 1935

Charleston (in what was then the Province of Carolina), where he was to die, had been settled from Bermuda under William Sayle in 1670, and many Bermudian families long remained prominent there. Notable among these was the Atlantic archipelago's Tucker family, which included Thomas Tudor Tucker and several notable Henry Tuckers. Reuben Henry Tucker III's paternal line, however, actually traces back to Robert Tucker, born in 1604 in Gravesend, Kent, England, who died in Milton, Massachusetts in 1682.

Reuben Henry Tucker III was born in 1911 to Reuben Henry Tucker, Jr. and his wife, Clare (née Booth). He was active in sports and Boy Scouts in his youth, proving his bravery and resourcefulness at 13 by pulling his drowning younger brother and a friend from a freezing mill pond. For this, he received a local award for heroism from the Scouts. While the boys in his high school social fraternity would nickname him "Duke" for his good looks and fastidious dress, and his family would call him "Tommy", he would be known by many as simply "Rube."

== West Point ==
Tucker's path to the United States Military Academy at West Point was not quite direct. The Tucker family had produced soldiers for all of America's wars since the Revolution, and worked in Ansonia's brass mill between wars. Tucker himself spent a year in the mill before entering a West Point prep school, Millard's. Despite passing the entrance exam, he did not secure an appointment in 1929 and spent a year out in Wyoming before joining the Class of 1934.

Due to a failing grade in mathematics, Tucker washed out of West Point. Fortunately, his determination to remain at the academy helped him in passing two days of exams for re-admission, which allowed him to be "turned back" and join the Class of 1935. Tucker married on the day following graduation. He and his wife would raise five boys over the ensuing decades.

== World War II ==
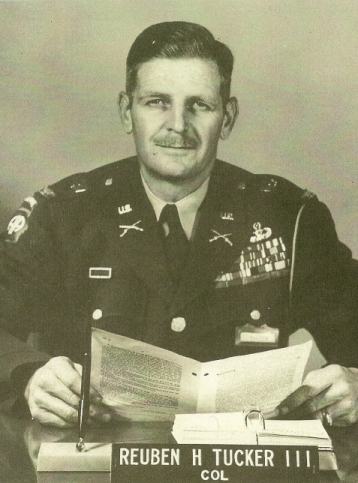
Tucker as 504th Parachute Infantry Regiment commander c. 1943–1945

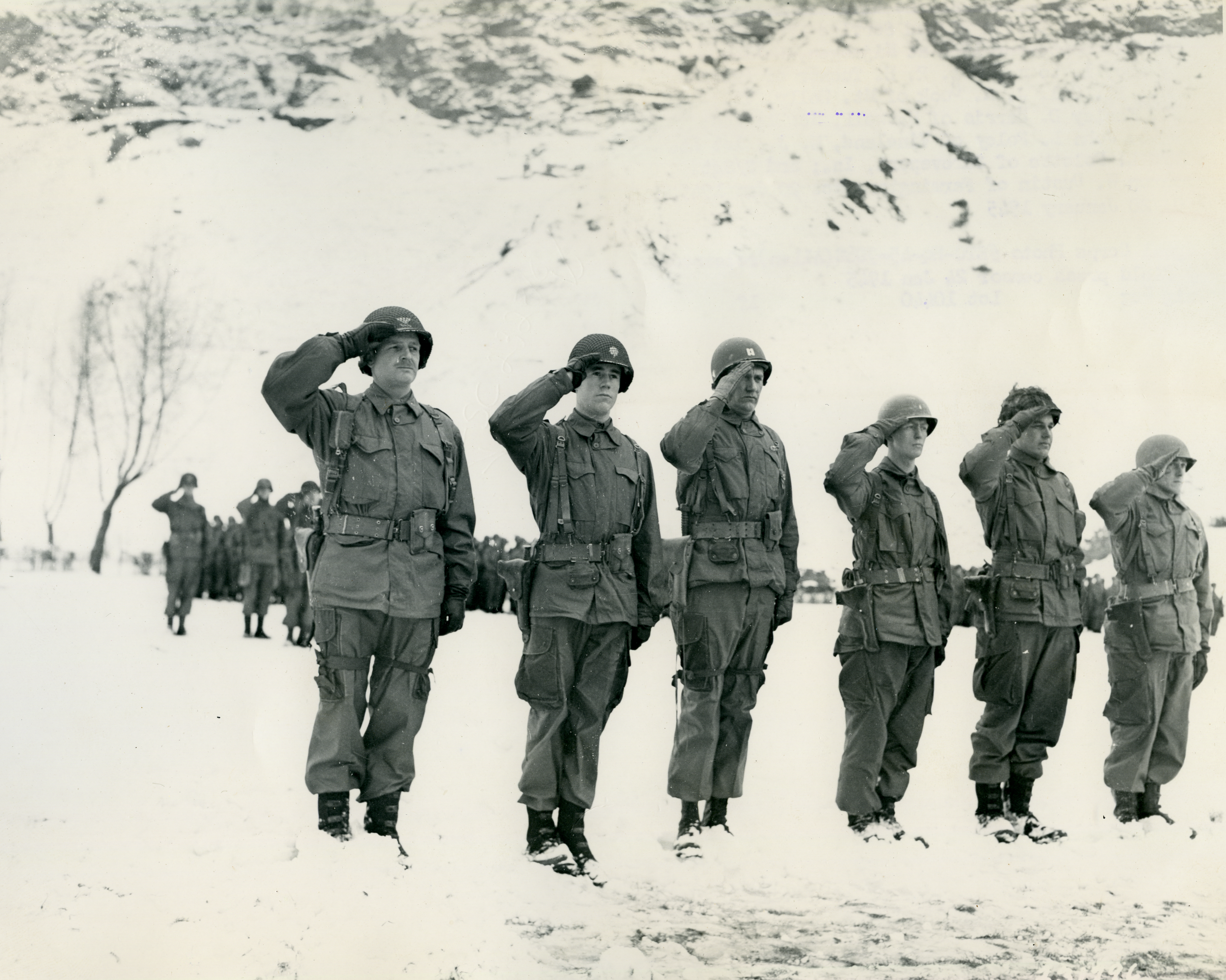
Tucker (far left) salutes after receiving the Distinguished Service Cross for his 20 September actions in Nijmegen c. January 1945. Julian Cook, his 3rd Battalion commander stands second from left.

Tucker volunteered for the paratroopers, part of the United States Army's newly created airborne forces, at Fort Benning, Georgia. Upon graduation Tucker, now a captain, was assigned to the 504th Parachute Infantry Battalion. Following activation of the 504th Parachute Infantry Regiment (PIR), on 1 May 1942, Tucker, now a major, was assigned as training officer and - after Lieutenant Colonel Richard Chase was transferred out in July 1942 - as the executive officer. The 504th was later assigned to the 82nd Airborne Division, under Major General Matthew Ridgway. On 1 December 1942, Colonel Theodore Dunn was removed from command by Ridgway, after two battalion inspections. He selected Tucker to take command the 504th PIR, which was welcomed by most battalion commanders. The other two regiments of the 325th and 326th Glider Infantry, along with supporting units. The 326th was later replaced by the 505th PIR. At 31 years of age, Tucker was one of the youngest regimental commanders during the war, despite his delay in entering and graduating from West Point.

On 11 July 1943, Tucker, who was by now a full colonel, led his troops in the Allied invasion of Sicily. There the American ground and sea forces, mistaking the 504th's aircraft for enemy planes, fired on the formations, resulting in the catastrophic loss of 23 aircraft, numerous casualties, and the scattering of troops all over the island. Tucker also led the 504th PIR during the Italian Campaign at Salerno and Anzio, at Nijmegen during Operation Market Garden, and during the Battle of the Bulge. Due to the number of casualties sustained during the fighting in Italy, Tucker and the rest of the 504th did not participate in the Allied invasion of Normandy, instead remaining in England.

Colonel Tucker was an outstanding combat leader during the war, and had a marked and lasting influence on many members of the 504th PIR through his traits of character, leadership ability, sense of humor, and understanding. He was affectionately referred to as "The Little Colonel" by the troops, and his presence among them often inspired their will to fight under adverse conditions. While fighting on the Anzio beachhead, they became known as the "Devils in Baggy Pants." The nickname remains with the regiment today.

Colonel James M. Gavin, who originally commanded the 505th PIR and later commanded the 82nd Airborne Division, stated in his book, "On to Berlin": "The 504th was commanded by a tough, superb combat leader, Colonel Reuben H. Tucker was probably the best regimental commander of the war." Gavin admitted that Tucker

was famous for screwing up everything that had to do with administration. One story going around was that when Tucker left Italy, he had an orange crate full of official charges against his soldiers and he just threw the whole crate into the ocean. Ridgway and I talked about it and we decided we just couldn't promote Tucker. (from 9/28/82 interview of Gavin by Clay Blair)

== Post-war assignments ==
Following the war, Colonel Tucker held varied positions and assignments, including as Commander 1st Cadet Regiment, West Point; staff and faculty, Air War College; student, Army War College; Commandant of Cadets, The Citadel; Assistant Division Commander, 101st Airborne Division and Chief Infantry Officers Branch, Department of the Army. Subsequent assignments were Commanding General of Fort Dix; Chief Military Assistance Advisory Group in Laos, and Assistant Chief of Staff G-3, United States Army, Pacific.

== Retirement ==
Tucker retired from the army in 1963, settling in Charleston, South Carolina, to assume a position he previously held on active duty, Commandant of Cadets at the Citadel where he remained until retiring a second time in February 1968.

On 6 January 1970, Tucker was found collapsed on the Citadel campus, the victim of an apparent heart attack. Funeral services were held in Beaufort, South Carolina, on 9 January 1970. Tucker's final resting place in Beaufort National Cemetery is located in close proximity to the graveside of his oldest son, who was killed in action in Vietnam.

== Awards and decorations ==
Tucker was highly decorated for his service in World War II. He was awarded two Distinguished Service Crosses, the United States' second highest medal for bravery, one of which was personally presented by President Franklin D. Roosevelt during a visit to Castelvetrano, Sicily, in December 1943, for extraordinary heroism under hostile fire in Italy in September.

- Distinguished Service Cross, twice
- Silver Star
- Legion of Merit, twice
- Bronze Star Medal
- Commendation Medal
- Purple Heart
- Combat Infantryman Badge
- Knight 4th Class of the Military Order of William (Netherlands, 22 February 1946)
- Order of the Patriotic War Second Class (Union of Soviet Socialist Republics)

== Bibliography ==
- Blair, Clay (2002). Ridgway's Paratroopers. Naval Institute Press. ISBN 1-55750-299-4.
- Lunteren, Frank van, Birth of a Regiment: The 504th Parachute Infantry Regiment in Sicily and Salerno, Permuted Press LLC, 2022.
- van Lunteren, Frank (2014). The Battle of the Bridges: The 504th Parachute Infantry Regiment in Operation Market Garden. Casemate Publishing. ISBN 978-1-61200232-3.
- Van Lunteren, Frank (2016). Spearhead of the Fifth Army: The 504th Parachute Infantry Regiment in Italy, from the Winter Line to Anzio. Casemate. ISBN 978-1-61200-427-3.
