= John F. Campbell (general) =

United States Army general (born 1957)

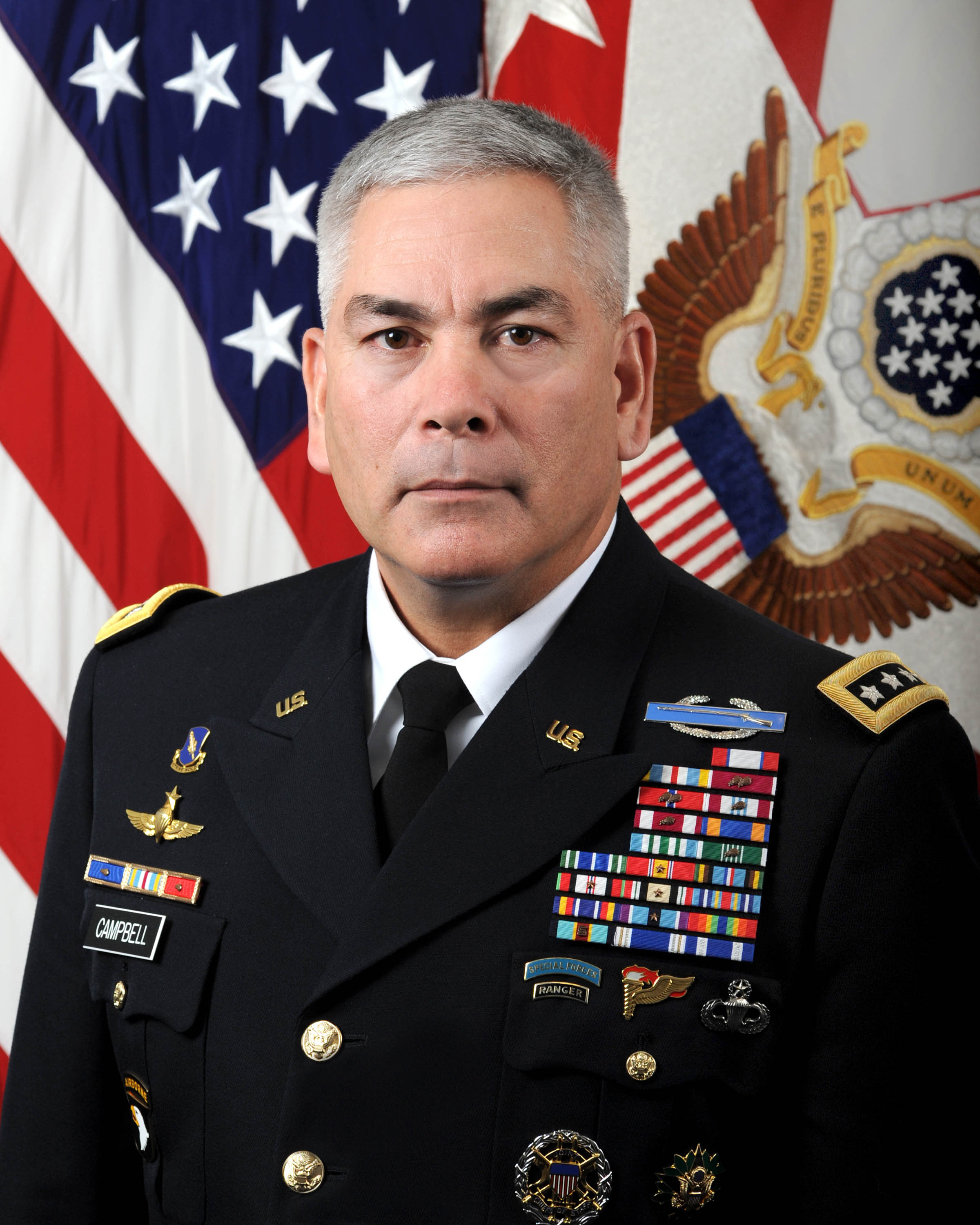
- Official portrait, 2013
- Born: 11 April 1957 (age 69); Loring Air Force Base, Maine, U.S.
- Military career
- Allegiance: United States
- Branch: United States Army
- Service years: 1979–2016
- Rank: General
- Commands: Resolute Support Mission; International Security Assistance Force; Vice Chief of Staff of the United States Army; 101st Airborne Division; Regional Command East; 504th Parachute Infantry Regiment
- Conflicts: War in Afghanistan; Iraq War
- Awards: Defense Distinguished Service Medal; Army Distinguished Service Medal (4); Defense Superior Service Medal; Legion of Merit (3); Bronze Star Medal (3)

John Francis Campbell (born 11 April 1957) is a retired United States Army general who was commander of the Resolute Support Mission and United States Forces – Afghanistan. He was the 16th and last commander of the International Security Assistance Force. Prior to this, he served as the 34th Vice Chief of Staff of the United States Army. He is currently a member of the board of directors of Rolls Royce North America, BAE Systems, Castellum, CodeMettle and Trillium and serves on the advisory board of AM General. He serves on several veteran non-profit boards, he chairs Army Emergency Relief, and is on the boards of Wounded Warrior Project and Homes For Our Troops.

== Early life and education ==
The son of a United States Air Force senior master sergeant, Campbell was born at Loring Air Force Base in Maine on 11 April 1957 and grew up on military bases around the world. In 1971, he became an Eagle Scout in Fairfield, California's Boy Scout Troop 270. In 1975, he graduated from Fairfield High School, where he was a participant in the Air Force Junior Reserve Officers' Training Corps (JROTC) program. He graduated from the United States Military Academy in June 1979 and was commissioned as a second lieutenant in the infantry. His first assignments were as a rifle platoon leader, company executive officer, and anti-tank platoon leader with the 3rd Battalion, 28th Infantry Regiment in Wiesbaden, Germany.

== Military career ==
After attending the Infantry Officer Advanced Course and the Special Forces Qualification Course, Campbell served as a Battalion Adjutant and Operational Detachment Alpha Commander in 1st Battalion, 5th Special Forces Group (Airborne) at Fort Bragg, North Carolina followed by assignments in the 82nd Airborne Division as commander of Bravo Company, 3rd Battalion, 505th Parachute Infantry Regiment and as the Division Assistant Operations and Training Officer (G-3 Air).

Campbell was then assigned as the assistant professor of Military Science and then the Professor of Military Science at the University of California, Davis.

He was selected to attend the Command and General Staff College, after which he was again assigned to Ft. Bragg and the 82nd Airborne Division, where he served as the Division Training and Operations (G-3) Officer, Brigade Operations Officer (S-3) for 2nd Brigade, 325th Airborne Infantry Regiment and as the Aide-de-camp for the XVIII Airborne Corps Commander (deployed during Operation Uphold Democracy).

Campbell commanded the 2nd Battalion 5th Infantry Regiment, 25th Infantry Division at Schofield Barracks, Hawaii followed by attendance at the United States Army War College in Carlisle, Pennsylvania. Upon graduation, he was assigned to the Joint Staff.

Campbell commanded 1st Brigade, 82nd Airborne Division and the 504th Parachute Infantry Regiment and deployed his Brigade Combat Team to Afghanistan in support of Operation Enduring Freedom.

Following command Campbell was assigned to the Army Staff and served as the Executive Officer to the 35th Chief of Staff of the United States Army, Peter J. Schoomaker.

=== General officer assignments ===
After promotion to general officer, in 2005, Campbell was assigned to Fort Hood, Texas as the Deputy Commanding General for Maneuver (DCG-M) for the 1st Cavalry Division and deployed to Iraq in support of Operation Iraqi Freedom as the DCG-M for Multi-National Division – Baghdad for both the 4th Infantry Division and the 1st Cavalry Division. Campbell's following assignment was as the deputy director for Regional Operations, (J-33), The Joint Staff.

In 2009, Campbell was named Commanding General, 101st Airborne Division, at Fort Campbell, Kentucky. While serving as the Commanding General, he also commanded Combined Joint Task Force 101 the operational headquarters for Regional Command East in Afghanistan from June 2010 to May 2011. Upon relinquishing command of the 101st Airborne Division in August 2011 to Major General James C. McConville, Campbell was promoted to Lieutenant General and became the Army Deputy Chief of Staff for Operations, Plans and Training (G-3/5/7).

Campbell was promoted to general and sworn in as the Vice Chief of Staff of the United States Army on 8 March 2013.

On 23 July 2014, Campbell was confirmed by the United States Senate to succeed General Joseph Dunford as commander International Security Assistance Force and United States Forces—Afghanistan. Campbell was succeeded by General John W. Nicholson Jr., on 2 March 2016, and retired on 1 May 2016.

On 25 July 2016, Turkish daily Yeni Şafak wrote that Campbell was "behind the failed coup" that had begun on 15 July. Campbell dismissed the allegation, stating that he had not traveled outside the United States since returning home from Afghanistan. He also stated that on the day of the coup, he and journalist Geraldo Rivera had met to socialize over drinks, a claim Rivera corroborated.

=== Dates of rank ===
Promotions
| Rank | Date |
|---|---|
| General | 8 March 2013 |
| Lieutenant General | August 2011 |
| Major General | 7 November 2008 |
| Brigadier General | 1 October 2005 |
| Colonel | 1 June 2000 |
| Lieutenant Colonel | 1 April 1995 |
| Major | 1 October 1990 |
| Captain | 1 June 1983 |
| First Lieutenant | 21 February 1981 |
| Second Lieutenant | 6 June 1979 |

== Awards and decorations ==
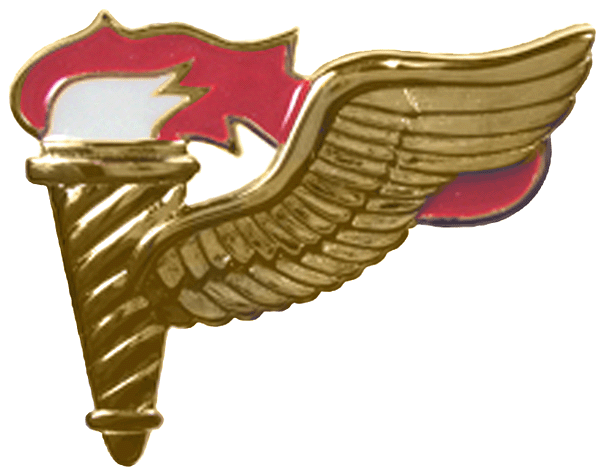
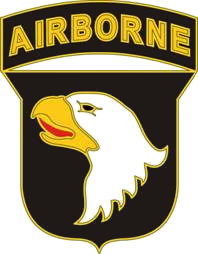
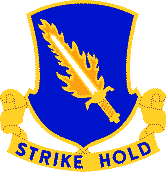
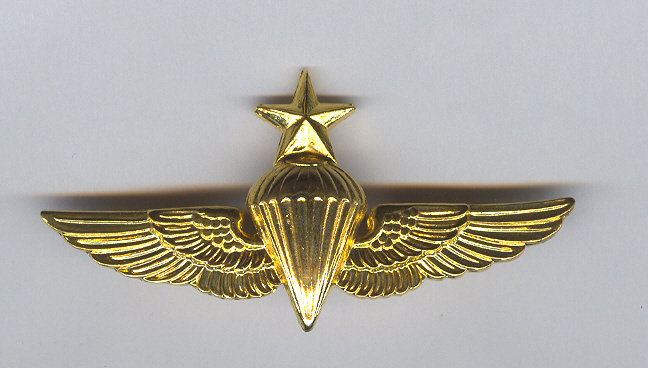
| Combat Infantryman Badge |
| Expert Infantryman Badge |
| Master Parachutist Badge |
| Pathfinder Badge |
| Special Forces Tab |
| Ranger Tab |
| Office of the Joint Chiefs of Staff Identification Badge |
| Army Staff Identification Badge |
| 101st Airborne Division Combat Service Identification Badge |
| 504th Infantry Regiment Distinctive Unit Insignia |
| Honduras Senior Parachutist badge |
| 9 Overseas Service Bars |

| Defense Distinguished Service Medal |
| Army Distinguished Service Medal with three bronze oak leaf clusters |
| Defense Superior Service Medal |
| Legion of Merit with two bronze oak leaf clusters |
| Bronze Star Medal with two oak leaf clusters |
| Defense Meritorious Service Medal with oak leaf cluster |
| Meritorious Service Medal with silver oak leaf cluster |
| Air Medal |
| Joint Service Commendation Medal |
| Army Commendation Medal with oak leaf cluster |
| Army Achievement Medal |
| Army Presidential Unit Citation with oak leaf cluster |
| Joint Meritorious Unit Award |
| Meritorious Unit Commendation with oak leaf cluster |
| National Defense Service Medal with one bronze service star |
| Armed Forces Expeditionary Medal |
| Afghanistan Campaign Medal with three service stars |
| Iraq Campaign Medal with one service star |
| Global War on Terrorism Expeditionary Medal |
| Global War on Terrorism Service Medal |
| Humanitarian Service Medal with one service star |
| Army Service Ribbon |
| Army Overseas Service Ribbon with bronze award numeral 5 |
| NATO Meritorious Service Medal |
| NATO Medal for Service with ISAF |
| First Grade High State Medal of Storai (Afghanistan) |

== See also ==
- Kunduz hospital airstrike

Military offices
| Preceded by Jeffrey J. Schloesser | Commander, 101st Airborne Division; July 2009 – August 2011 | Succeeded by James C. McConville |
| Preceded by Lloyd Austin | Vice Chief of Staff of the United States Army; 8 March 2013 – 14 August 2014 | Succeeded by Daniel B. Allyn |
| Preceded by Joseph F. Dunford, Jr. | Commander, ISAF and US Forces Afghanistan; 26 August 2014 – 28 December 2014 | Succeeded by |
| Preceded by | Commander, Resolute Support Mission and US Forces Afghanistan; 28 December 2014 – 2 March 2016 | Succeeded by John W. Nicholson Jr. |
