= 456th Parachute Field Artillery Battalion (United States) =

The 456th Parachute Field Artillery Battalion (456th PFAB) is an inactive airborne field artillery battalion of the United States Army. Active with the 82nd Airborne Division from 1943–1948, the battalion deployed to Italy, France, Belgium, the Netherlands and Germany.

== Lineage ==
- Constituted 18 September 1942 in the Army of the United States as the 456th Parachute Field Artillery Battalion
- Activated 24 September 1942 at Fort Bragg, North Carolina
- Assigned to the 82nd Airborne Division, 10 February 1943
- Redesignated 15 December 1947 as the 456th Airborne Field Artillery Battalion
- Allotted 15 November 1948 to the Regular Army
- Inactivated 1 September 1957 at Fort Bragg, North Carolina

== Campaign participation credit ==
- World War II: Sicily (with arrowhead); Naples-Foggia; Rome-Arno; Normandy (with arrowhead); Rhineland (with arrowhead); Ardennes-Alsace; Central Europe

== Decorations ==
- Belgian Fourragere 1940
  - Cited in the Order of the Day of the Belgian Army for action in the ARDENNES
  - Cited in the Order of the Day of the Belgian Army for action in BELGIUM AND GERMANY
- Netherlands Military Order of William (Degree of the Knight of the Fourth Class), Streamer embroidered NIJMEGEN 1944
- Netherlands Orange Lanyard

== See also ==
- 82nd Airborne Division
- 82nd Airborne Division Artillery
