= John R. Towle =

United States Army Medal of Honor recipient (1924–1944)

John Roderick Towle
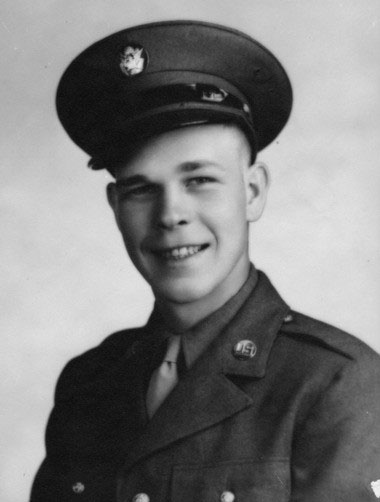
- John R. Towle, pictured here in 1943.
- Born: October 19, 1924; Cleveland, Ohio, United States
- Died: September 21, 1944 (aged 19); Oosterhout, Netherlands †
- Burial place: Calvary Cemetery, Cleveland, Ohio, United States
- Military career
- Allegiance: United States
- Branch: United States Army
- Service years: 1943–1944
- Rank: Private
- Units: 504th Parachute Infantry Regiment, 82nd Airborne Division
- Conflicts: World War II: North African campaign; Italian campaign; Operation Market Garden †
- Awards: Medal of Honor; Purple Heart

Private John Roderick Towle (October 19, 1924 – September 21, 1944) was a United States Army soldier who served during World War II, and was posthumously awarded the Medal of Honor for his actions during Operation Market Garden.

== Military career ==
John Towle was born on October 19, 1924, one of five siblings. He joined the United States Army during World War II, enlisting in March 1943, and volunteered for the airborne infantry. After training he was assigned to Company 'C' of the 1st Battalion, 504th Parachute Infantry Regiment (504th PIR), part of the 82nd "All American" Airborne Division.

Towle served with the 504th PIR in the campaigns in North Africa and Italy. In April 1944, the regiment left Italy and redeployed to England, where it remained until September 1944, awaiting orders to deploy to north west Europe. Those orders came as part of Operation Market Garden, and Towle made his only combat jump into the Netherlands on September 17, 1944.

On September 21, 1944, 504th PIR was in action near hamlet Oosterhout in defence of the bridges at Nijmegen, when they came under attack from around 100 enemy soldiers, two tanks and a half-track. Without orders, Towle left his foxhole and moved 200 yards under small arms fire into an exposed position where he engaged the two tanks with his rocket launcher. He hit and damaged both tanks, which withdrew from action.

Still under fire, Towle engaged a nearby house which the Germans were using as a strongpoint, and with one rocket killed all nine men. Having reloaded, he ran a further 125 yards to attempt to destroy the half-track. While kneeling and preparing to fire on the vehicle, he was hit by a mortar shell and killed.

For his actions, Towle was posthumously awarded the Medal of Honor, the US military’s highest award for gallantry. The medal was presented to his parents on March 25, 1945. Towle was the first member of the 82nd Airborne Division to be awarded the medal during World War II. (Note: Charles N. DeGlopper, also of the 82nd Airborne Division, 'earned' an earlier Medal of Honor in June 1944, but his was not awarded until 1946.) Towle, aged 19 at his death, was buried at Calvary Cemetery in his hometown of Cleveland, Ohio.

== Medal of Honor Citation ==
For conspicuous gallantry and intrepidity at the risk of life above and beyond the call of duty on 21 September 1944, near Oosterhout, Holland. The rifle company in which Pvt. Towle served as rocket launcher gunner was occupying a defensive position in the west sector of the recently established Nijmegen bridgehead when a strong enemy force of approximately 100 infantry supported by two tanks and a half-track formed a counterattack. With full knowledge of the disastrous consequences resulting not only to his company but to the entire bridgehead by an enemy breakthrough, Pvt. Towle immediately and without orders left his foxhole and moved 200 yards in the face of intense small-arms fire to a position on an exposed dike roadbed. From this precarious position Pvt. Towle fired his rocket launcher at and hit both tanks to his immediate front. Armored skirting on both tanks prevented penetration by the projectiles, but both vehicles withdrew slightly damaged. Still under intense fire and fully exposed to the enemy, Pvt. Towle then engaged a nearby house which nine Germans had entered and were using as a strongpoint, and with one round killed all nine. Hurriedly replenishing his supply of ammunition, Pvt. Towle, motivated only by his high conception of duty which called for the destruction of the enemy at any cost, then rushed approximately 125 yards through grazing enemy fire to an exposed position from which he could engage the enemy half-track with his rocket launcher. While in a kneeling position preparatory to firing on the enemy vehicle, Pvt. Towle was mortally wounded by a mortar shell. By his heroic tenacity, at the price of his life, Pvt. Towle saved the lives of many of his comrades and was directly instrumental in breaking up the enemy counterattack.

== Legacy ==
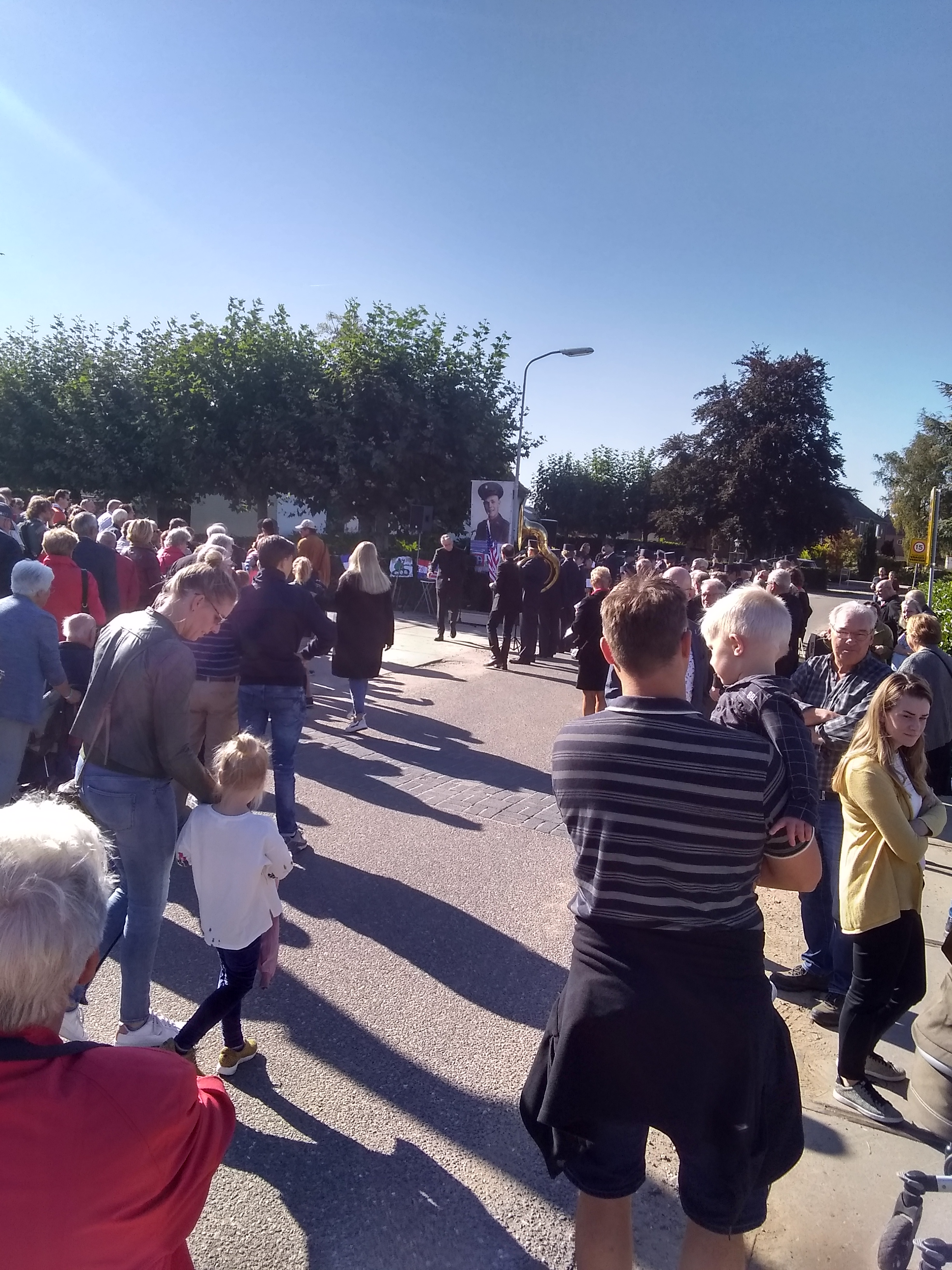

The USNS Private John R. Towle (T-AK-240) was named in his honor.

Towle Fitness Center in Fort Bragg, North Carolina was named in his honor.

The citizens of Oosterhout marched in a parade in Private Towle's honor and renamed a street in the village after him on the morning of September 21, 2019, on the 75th anniversary of his heroism and their liberation.

On September 21, 2024, 80 years after his death, the village unveiled a new monument. The committee, consisting of five villagers, realized the monument. Under the watchful eye of the 82nd Airborne Division, a delegation from the US Embassy, the Alderman of the municipality of Overbetuwe, direct family members of the Towle family, and hundreds of villagers, the monument was unveiled. The monument is located on John R. Towle Street in a grassy area at the corner with Peperstraat.

== See also ==
- List of Medal of Honor recipients
- List of Medal of Honor recipients for World War II
