= USNS Private Frank J. Petrarca =

Cargo ship of the United States Navy

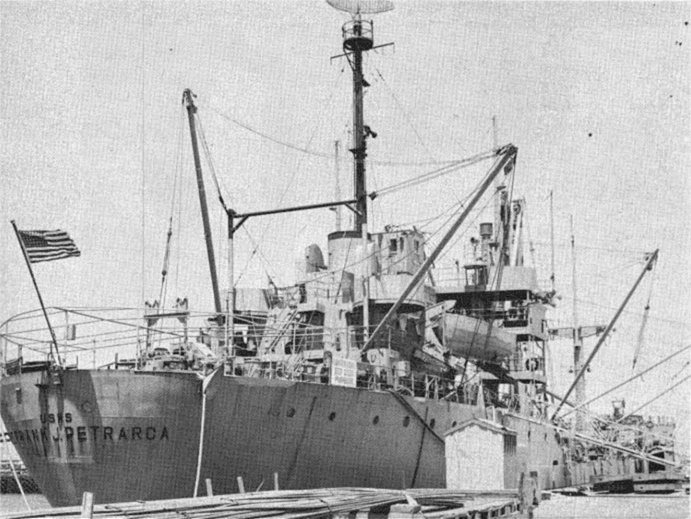
- USNS Private Frank J. Petrarca (T-AK-250), moored, date and location unknown.

History

United States
- Name: Long Splice
- Namesake: Long splice
- Ordered: as type (C1-M-AV1) hull, MC hull 2329
- Builder: Consolidated Steel Corporation, Long Beach, California
- Yard number: 1234
- Laid down: 18 April 1945
- Launched: 7 August 1945
- Sponsored by: Mrs. Eloi J. Amar
- Commissioned: delivered to the Maritime Commission (MARCOM) prior to commissioning, 20 September 1945
- Identification: Hull symbol: AK-250 (never received number); Code letters: NQDH
- Fate: Transferred to the War Shipping Administration (WSA)

United States
- Name: Private Frank J. Petrarca
- Namesake: Frank J. Petrarca, awarded the Medal of Honor
- Owner: WSA
- Operator: US Army
- Acquired: 3 October 1946
- In service: 3 October 1946
- Out of service: 1 March 1950
- Fate: Transferred to the US Navy, 1 March 1950

United States
- Name: Private Frank J. Petrarca
- Owner: US Navy
- Operator: Military Sea Transportation Service (MSTS)
- Acquired: 1 March 1950
- In service: 1 March 1950
- Out of service: 9 April 1959
- In service: 7 April 1960
- Stricken: 15 October 1973
- Identification: Hull symbol: T-AK-250
- Fate: Sold, 28 December 1977

United States
- Name: Artic Producer; Artic Enterprise
- Owner: General Auto Wrecking Company; Trident Seafoods Company
- Acquired: 28 December 1977
- Renamed: 1991
- Identification: IMO number: 8835528; MMSI number: 366775880; Callsign: WDB4537
- Fate: converted to Fish Factory Ship
- Status: Active as of 2013

General characteristics
- Class & type: Alamosa-class cargo ship
- Type: C1-M-AV1
- Tonnage: 5,032 long tons deadweight (DWT)
- Displacement: 2,382 long tons (2,420 t) (standard); 7,450 long tons (7,570 t) (full load)
- Length: 388 ft 8 in (118.47 m)
- Beam: 50 ft (15 m)
- Draft: 21 ft 1 in (6.43 m)
- Installed power: 1 × Nordberg, TSM 6 diesel engine; 1,750 shp (1,300 kW)
- Propulsion: 1 × propeller
- Speed: 11.5 kn (21.3 km/h; 13.2 mph)
- Capacity: 3,945 t (3,883 long tons) DWT; 9,830 cu ft (278 m^{3}) (refrigerated); 227,730 cu ft (6,449 m^{3}) (non-refrigerated)
- Complement: 15 Officers; 70 Enlisted

USNS Private Frank J. Petrarca (T-AK-250) was a US Maritime Administration (MARCOM) C1-M-AV1 type coastal cargo ship, originally planned as an Alamosa-class cargo ship. Constructed as Long Splice for MARCOM, completed in September 1945 and placed in operation by the War Shipping Administration (WSA) during the closing period of World War II. However, the war ended, and she was transferred to the US Army as USAT Private Frank J. Petrarca who kept her in service until transferred to the US Navy in 1950.

== Construction ==
Long Splice was laid down under MARCOM contract, MC hull 2329, by the Consolidated Steel Corporation, Ltd., Long Beach, California, 18 April 1945; launched 8 July 1945; sponsored by Mrs. Eloi J. Amar; and delivered to the MARCOM, thence to Lykes Brothers, 20 September 1945.

As Long Splice, the cargo ship was operated by Lykes Brothers under General Agency Agreement until 25 June 1946 when the agreement was changed to bareboat charter. On 29 August 1946 the ship returned to the MARCOM and transferred to the War Department under bareboat charter.

== US Army service ==
The ship's title was transferred to the Army 3 October 1946 with the name changed to Private Frank J. Petrarca 31 October 1947. The ship operated with the Army Transportation Service (ATS) until transferred to the Navy, 1 July 1950 after the disestablishment of ATS and establishment of the Military Sea Transportation Service (MSTS) under the new Department of Defense.

== US Navy service ==
Placed in service, with the designation T–AK–250 on 6 July 1950, Private Frank J. Petrarca was assigned to MSTS and served the Mid-Pacific Ocean area until 1959.

Between 9 April 1959 and 4 July 1960, the AK was laid up at Suisun Bay, California, as a unit of the Maritime Administration's National Defense Reserve Fleet.

The ship was reactivated for MSTS service after private industry was unable to support construction on Kanton Island (also known as Canton Island) of a telemetry tracking station to support Project Mercury. The station, composed of the telemetry facility and five other buildings for housing and support, was constructed by the Pacific SeaBee battalion supported largely by Private Frank J. Petrarca. In 1962, she participated in a cost and feasibility study of year-round ocean service in Alaskan waters.

== Antarctic service ==
Four years later, she delivered supplies to McMurdo Sound, Antarctica, to support Deep Freeze ‘66. In accomplishing that mission she became the first cargo ship to be so employed without benefit of an ice-strengthened hull. Since that time, into 1970, Private Frank J. Petrarca continued to carry vital supplies and equipment, particularly to southeast Asia, for MSTS, Pacific.

== Final inactivation ==
She was struck from the Navy List on 15 October 1973. The ship was sold for non transportation use on 16 December 1977 for $68,010 to General Auto Wrecking Co. which resold the vessel to Trident Seafoods Co. for use as the fish processing ship Arctic Producer and later Artic Enterprise in 1991.

== Notes ==
Citations

== Bibliography ==
Online resources

- Bureau of Naval Personnel (1962). Military Sea Transportation Service (NAVPERS 10829-B). NAVPERS 10829. Washington, D.C.: Bureau of Naval Personnel.
- "Private Frank J. Petrarca". Dictionary of American Naval Fighting Ships. Naval History and Heritage Command. 24 August 2015. This article incorporates text from this source, which is in the public domain.
- "C1 Cargo Ships". www.ShipbuildingHistory.com. 28 August 2009.
- Maritime Administration. "PRIVATE FRANK J. PETRARCA (T-AK-250)". Ship History Database Vessel Status Card. U.S. Department of Transportation, Maritime Administration.
- "USNS Private Frank J. Petrarca (T-AK-250)". NavSource. 31 July 2015.
