= Charles N. DeGlopper =

US Army soldier and Medal of Honor recipient

Charles Neilans DeGlopper
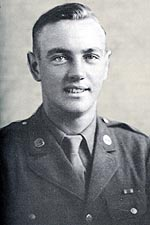
- Medal of Honor recipient
- Born: November 30, 1921; Grand Island, New York, US
- Died: June 9, 1944 (aged 22); Manche, Normandy, France †
- Burial place: Maple Grove Cemetery, Grand Island, New York
- Military career
- Allegiance: United States of America
- Branch: United States Army
- Service years: 1942-1944
- Rank: Private First Class
- Service number: 32581337
- Units: 325th Glider Infantry Regiment, 82nd Airborne Division
- Conflicts: World War II: Western Allied invasion of France; Battle of Normandy †
- Awards: Medal of Honor; Bronze Star; Purple Heart

Charles Neilans DeGlopper (November 30, 1921 – June 9, 1944) was a soldier of the United States Army who posthumously received the Medal of Honor, the highest award of the U.S. military, for his heroic actions and sacrifice of life during the early stages of the Battle of Normandy in World War II.

A Grand Island, New York, native, DeGlopper was the only soldier from the 325th Glider Infantry Regiment to receive the Medal of Honor. He was also the only World War II soldier from the 82nd Airborne Division of the U.S. Army to receive the award for action during the Normandy Campaign.

== Early life ==
DeGlopper was born on November 30, 1921, to Mary Neilans DeGlopper and Charles Leonard DeGlopper. His family home was located at 2176 Fix Road, Grand Island, New York, and he attended School #5 on Baseline and Bush Roads in Grand Island. In June 1941, he graduated from Tonawanda High School before entering the Army in November 1942. After training at Camp Croft, South Carolina, he was sent overseas in April 1943 and served in the 82nd Airborne Division in North Africa, Sicily, elsewhere in Italy, and France.

== 82nd Airborne Division Service ==
=== Medal of Honor Action ===
In the late evening of June 6, 1944, the 82nd Airborne's glider troops began to arrive in France staged from Aldermaston airfield, each involving hundreds of CG-4 Waco and Airspeed Horsa gliders and managed in code-named phases denoted: Mission Keokuk, Mission Elmira, and the final two glider landings were scheduled for June 7, 1944 during the morning hours in Missions Galveston and Hackensack which brought in the 325th Glider Infantry Regiment (325th GIR). Mission Galveston arrived in two serials of fifty gliders each and while the first had something of a disastrous landing, the second fared slightly better, but less than 50% of their equipment was recoverable. Mission Hackensack, the last to arrive, brought in the remaining 1,300 glidermen of the 325th GIR and their equipment. Also arriving in two serials, the gliders began landing on the 7th at 0900 in broad daylight. Despite the apparent destruction on the ground, the operation was a great success with most of the troops and nearly all of their equipment getting delivered to the battlefield. Nearly 90% of the 325th GIR's men were assembled within a few hours of landing and moved towards Chef-du-Pont.

Leading his troops, regimental commander Colonel Harry Lewis was ordered to make a crossing of the Merderet River and help attack La Fière Bridge from the opposite side. Seeing a small fording area across the river, Col. Lewis sent his 1st Battalion to wade across under cover of darkness; their objective was to attack the force defending the bridge. Themselves under attack, C Company 1st Battalion was cut off from the rest of the battalion and despite himself coming under increased fire, Private First Class Charles DeGlopper stood up and began to fire his Browning Automatic Rifle at the attacking Germans in an attempt to suppress their fire and relieve the battalion.

Although wounded, PFC DeGlopper continued to stand and fire, and when hit yet again, still fired although kneeling and bleeding profusely. Meanwhile, as the Germans were distracted and occupied with PFC DeGlopper's automatic fire, the remainder of C Company was able to break off and head for La Fière to join the rest of their battalion.

For his self-sacrificial actions, Private First Class Charles DeGlopper posthumously received the Medal of Honor on February 28, 1946, the only member of the 82nd Airborne Division so honored in Normandy.

== Medal of Honor Citation ==
The President of the United States, in the name of The Congress, takes pleasure in presenting the Medal of Honor to

Private First Class Charles N. DeGlopper
United States Army

for service as set forth in the following CITATION:

He was a member of Company C, 325th Glider Infantry, on 9 June 1944 advancing with the forward platoon to secure a bridgehead across the Merderet River at La Fière, France. At dawn the platoon had penetrated an outer line of machineguns and riflemen, but in so doing had become cut off from the rest of the company. Vastly superior forces began a decimation of the stricken unit and put in motion a flanking maneuver which would have completely exposed the American platoon in a shallow roadside ditch where it had taken cover. Detecting this danger, Pfc. DeGlopper volunteered to support his comrades by fire from his automatic rifle while they attempted a withdrawal through a break in a hedgerow 40 yards to the rear. Scorning a concentration of enemy automatic weapons and rifle fire, he walked from the ditch onto the road in full view of the Germans, and sprayed the hostile positions with assault fire. He was wounded, but he continued firing. Struck again, he started to fall; and yet his grim determination and valiant fighting spirit could not be broken. Kneeling in the roadway, weakened by his grievous wounds, he leveled his heavy weapon against the enemy and fired burst after burst until killed outright. He was successful in drawing the enemy action away from his fellow soldiers, who continued the fight from a more advantageous position and established the first bridgehead over the Merderet. In the area where he made his intrepid stand his comrades later found the ground strewn with dead Germans and many machineguns and automatic weapons which he had knocked out of action. Pfc. DeGlopper's gallant sacrifice and unflinching heroism while facing insurmountable odds were in great measure responsible for a highly important tactical victory in the Normandy Campaign.

Rank and organization: Private First Class, U.S. Army, Co. C, 325th Glider Infantry, 82d Airborne Division.
Place and date: Merderet River at la Fiere, France, June 9, 1944.
Entered service at: Grand Island, N.Y.
Birth: Grand Island, N.Y.
G.O. No.: 22, February 28, 1946.

== Military Awards ==
DeGlopper's military decorations and awards include:

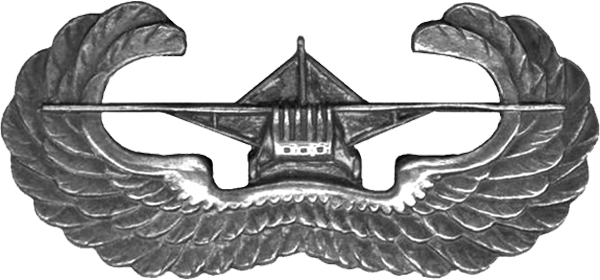

Badge	Combat Infantryman Badge		
1st row	Medal of Honor	Bronze Star Medal	Purple Heart
2nd row	Army Good Conduct Medal	European-African-Middle Eastern Campaign Medal w/bronze arrowhead device and three bronze service stars for the Naples-Foggia (Ground), Sicily (Ground) and Normandy campaigns. Authorized arrowhead device for Normandy, 6-7 Jun 44, per WDGO 116–46.	World War II Victory Medal
Badge	Glider Badge		
Unit awards	Presidential Unit Citation WDGO 14–45, for the period 7-9 Jun 44, for 325th Glider Infantry Regiment, 82nd Airborne Division as per Department of the Army Pamphlet 672-1 dated July 6, 1961, page 257	French Fourragère DAGO 43–50, for the periods 5-6 Jun 44 and 6-20 Jun 44, for 325th Glider Infantry Regiment, 82nd Airborne as per Department of the Army Pamphlet 672-1 dated July 6, 1961, page 257	

== Death and Posthumous Recognition ==
DeGlopper was killed in action on June 9, 1944, at La Fière in Normandy, France.

On February 28, 1945, he was posthumously recommended for the Medal of Honor by Captain Wayne W. Pierce, 325th Glider Infantry, Commanding Company C. He was then posthumously awarded the Medal of Honor on March 10, 1946. The award was presented to his father by Major General Leland S. Hobbs at a ceremony at Trinity Evangelical United Brethren Church in Grand Island.

- December 3, 1947: US Army Transport "Elgin Victory" is renamed the "Pvt. Charles N. DeGlopper" at the Brooklyn Army Base at Brooklyn, New York. Following the ceremony, the ship left for Bremerhaven, Germany, with arrival expected on December 17, 1947. The 7,607-ton vessel was built in 1945 in California.
- April 5, 1948: Road at Fort Bragg, North Carolina, named for Charles N. DeGlopper
- July 7, 1948: Charles N. DeGlopper's body is returned from France to the Buffalo Central Terminal, Buffalo, New York. Traveled the six miles from the terminal to the Connecticut Street Armory by caisson.
- July 8–9, 1948: Charles N. DeGlopper's body, along with two others, lies in state at the Connecticut Street Armory.
- July 9, 1948: Evening wake is held in the family home on Fix Road.
- July 10, 1948: Funeral from family home. Service read by Rev. J. Franklin Beck, Trinity Evangelical United Brethren Church. Charles N DeGlopper buried in Maple Grove Cemetery, Whitehaven Road, Grand Island (actually on Stony Pt.) Military rites conducted by Grand Island Post 1346, American Legion.
- December 7, 1958: US Army Reserve Training Center, Colvin Blvd., Tonawanda, New York, is dedicated to Charles N. DeGlopper and named the Charles DeGlopper Center. It is a 600-person armory costing approx. $500,000.
- May, 1962: American Legion Post 1346 appropriates and dedicates Charles DeGlopper Park, Baseline Road and Grand Island Boulevard, Grand Island, New York, Garden Club, who continue today to maintain it. First services held for Memorial Day 1962.
- November 1965: Charles N. DeGlopper Memorial VFW Post #9249 named for Charles N. DeGlopper
- October 1992: Grand Island Historical Society World War II Display for the Huth Road Elementary School Fourth Graders. This was the first public display of Charles N. DeGlopper's Medal of Honor
- June 9, 1994: 50th Anniversary of Charles N. DeGlopper's Death
- June 9–11, 1994: Ceremonies at Maple Grove Cemetery and DeGlopper Park, Skydivers and a Presentation of Flags at Veterans Park, Display of Memorabilia, Vehicles and Artifacts at Historic Trinity Church, all on Grand Island Organized by the Niagara Frontier All Airborne Chapter, 82nd Airborne, Grand Island Historical Society, Town of Grand Island
- June 9, 2002: On the island community of Grand Island, New York, the Charles DeGlopper VFW (Veterans of Foreign Wars) Post #9249 dedicated a new headstone on the grave of the island's native son, Charles N. DeGlopper, C Company, 325th Glider Infantry. The new marker recognizes the fact that Charles DeGlopper was awarded the Medal of Honor after his death during the Normandy invasion.
- June 12, 2004: Ceremonies at Maple Grove Cemetery commemorating his life and sacrifice 2:00 PM on Saturday, June 12, 2004.
- June 4, 2010: Annual Ceremony at the Charles DeGlopper Memorial Panel at La Fiere, Normandy (France).
- 2014 The Fort Bragg Air Assault School formally renamed The DeGlopper Air Assault School after Charles N. DeGlopper

== Cultural references ==
The novel March Upcountry contains a fictional space ship, the Charles DeGlopper, in honor of Charles N. DeGlopper.

The physical training field between the barracks of 1st and 2nd Battalions of the 325th Airborne Infantry Regiment (the modern-day descendant of the Glider Infantry Regiment) is named DeGlopper Field

Charles DeGlopper's sacrifice is also mentioned in the D-Day episode of the TV documentary, "Road to Victory" (2011), narrated by historian Ellwood von Seibold.

== See also ==
- List of Medal of Honor recipients
- List of Medal of Honor recipients for World War II
