= Calvary Cemetery (Cleveland) =

Roman Catholic cemetery in Cleveland, Ohio

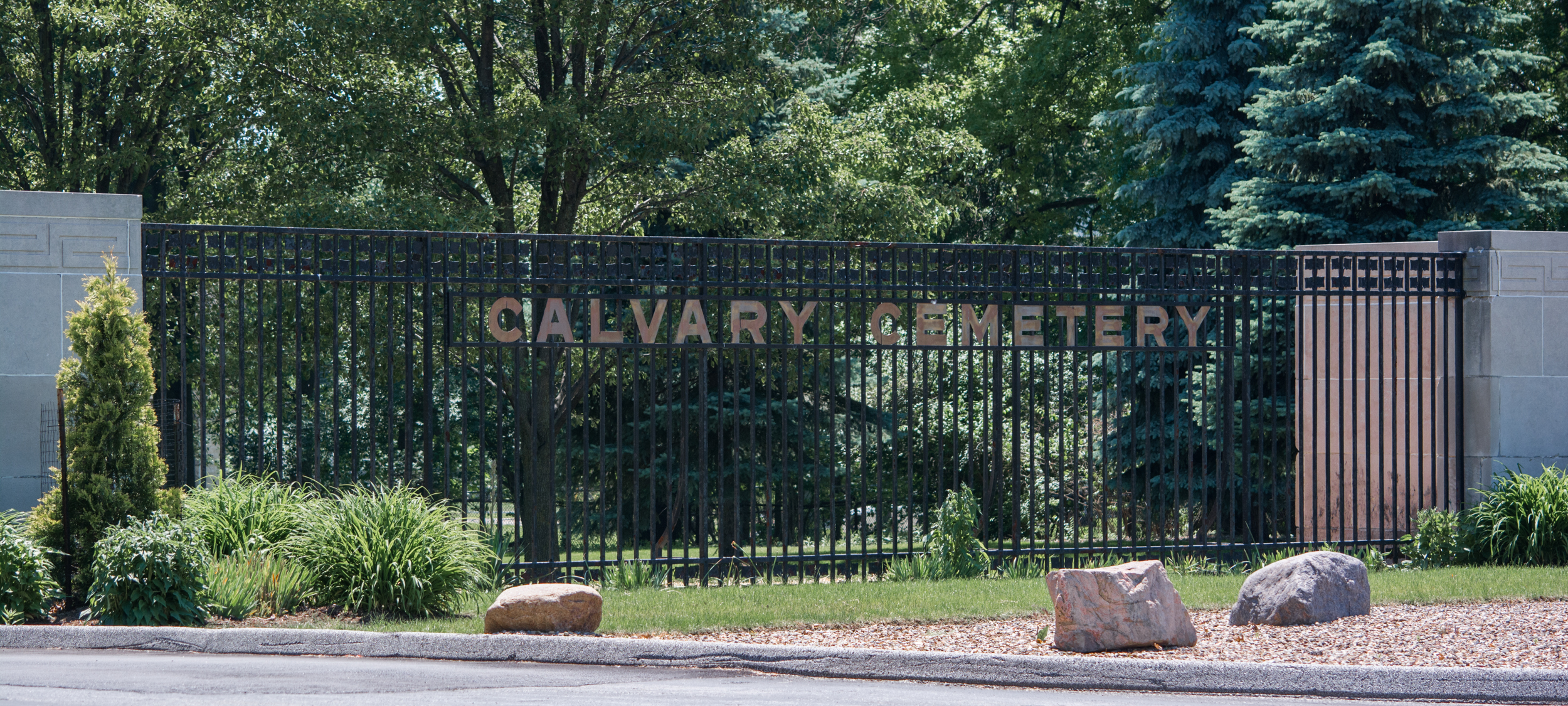
- Interactive map of Calvary Cemetery

Details
- Established: November 26, 1893
- Location: Cleveland, Ohio, U.S.
- Country: United States
- Coordinates: 41.440356°N 81.606810°W
- Type: Private
- Owned by: Roman Catholic Diocese of Cleveland
- Size: 275 acres (1,110,000 m^{2})
- No. of graves: 300,000 (2017)
- Website: Calvary Cemetery
- Find a Grave: Calvary Cemetery
- The Political Graveyard: Calvary Cemetery

Calvary Cemetery is a Roman Catholic cemetery in Cleveland, Ohio, in the United States. The cemetery straddles the border between Cleveland and the city of Garfield Heights, with its offices within the city limits of Cleveland. Calvary Cemetery is the largest Catholic cemetery in Cleveland, and one of the largest in Ohio.

== History ==
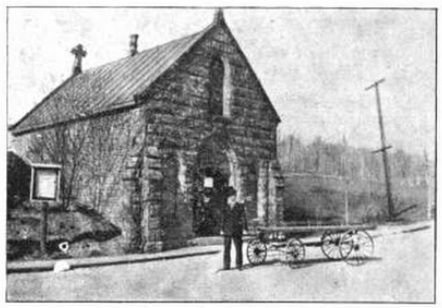
The early stone receiving vault

In 1892, the Roman Catholic Diocese of Cleveland purchased approximately 105 acres (420,000 m^{2}) of land east of Broadway Avenue in what was then Newburgh Township. The cost of the land was $600 ($20,017 in 2025 dollars). Formerly the Leand farm, it was named Calvary Cemetery. Toledo cemetery designer, horticulturist, and cemetery superintendent Frank Eurich designed Calvary as a lawn cemetery. The land was regraded and other initial improvements made by The William H. Evers Engineering Company. Calvary Cemetery was consecrated on November 26, 1893.

Within just a few years, the cemetery featured a stone receiving vault, waiting room at the entrance, and a number of roads. A streetcar spur ran adjacent to the cemetery, allowing caskets and funeral parties to reach the cemetery by electric train. The 746-foot (227 m) long spur was removed in 1927.

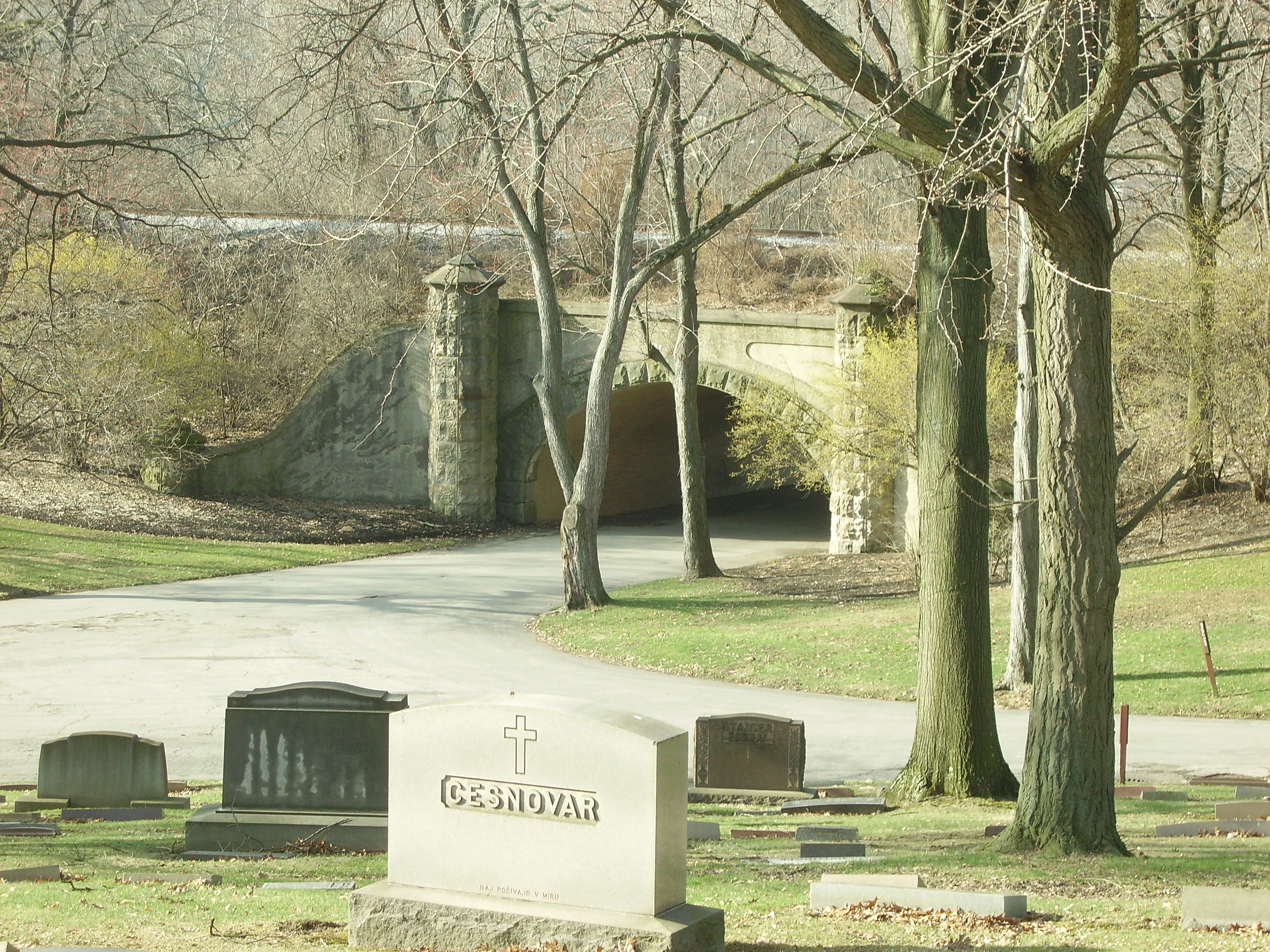
Tunnel beneath the railroad tracks

Initially, the cemetery was bounded on its east side by the Connotton Valley Railway, whose tracks were laid in 1882. An additional purchase of land east of the railroad tracks was made in 1900. Various figures have been cited for the size of this property: 50 acres (200,000 m^{2}), 200 acres (810,000 m^{2}), and 250 acres (1,000,000 m^{2}). Fifty acres appears to be the best figure, and is supported by an industry trade journal which reported the cemetery's total size as a total 160 acres (650,000 m^{2}) in 1900. (Note: Only 40 acres (160,000 m^{2}) were improved, however.) Additional land was acquired by 1908, giving the cemetery either 250 acres (1,000,000 m^{2}) or 300 acres (1,200,000 m^{2}) of total land. The cemetery acquired the 13 acres (53,000 m^{2}) Quigley farm and the 9 acres (36,000 m^{2}) Stegkemper tract in 1910. Calvary's reported size was 350 acres (1,400,000 m^{2}) in 1936. The streetcar line was torn up in 1947, and the 30 by 2,248 feet (9.1 by 685.2 m) strip of land sold to the cemetery for $600 ($8,651 in 2025 dollars). Calvary Cemetery reportedly still had more than 300 acres (1,200,000 m^{2}) of land in 2007.

As of 2007, there were over 305,000 interments at Calvary Cemetery. The first burials, of John and Catharine Hogan, were on November 30, 1893. Husband and wife, they died one day apart and were buried in section 10. The largest number of burials occurred on November 4, 1918, during the Spanish flu pandemic. There were 81 burials that day. The total number of interments that month was 985. The cemetery contains the Commonwealth war graves of two World War I soldiers of the Canadian Army.

Calvary Cemetery is the largest Catholic cemetery in Cleveland, and operated by the Catholic Cemeteries Association.

=== Memorials ===
A large memorial angel atop a pedestal inscribed "Our Babies" was dedicated on November 2, 1952, in what is now section 105 of the cemetery. This section was then set aside for the burial of infants and children. The news media did not identify the sculptor or manufacturer.

In 1966, the cemetery opened a new section (now identified as Section 43) near the E. 100th Street entrance. This section was dedicated to in-ground, flat headstones typical of lawn cemeteries. Overlooking the section, the cemetery constructed a grotto and placed a life-size terracotta statue of Christ in the niche. The manufacturer of the statue was not identified by the press.

A statue of Our Lady, Queen of Heaven was erected at the E. 100th Street entrance of Calvary Cemetery in 2001. The statue was paid for by the Lausche Foundation and dedicated to the memory Senator Frank Lausche.

After the Diocese of Cleveland closed or merged more than 75 parishes between 2006 and 2010, several works of art were moved to Calvary Cemetery. After St. Hyacinth Church closed in September 2009, its monument to Catholic war veterans was moved to the entrance of Calvary Cemetery. St. Margaret of Hungary Church originally was located in Cleveland's Buckeye–Shaker neighborhood. In 1960, parishioners erected a life-size statuary group to honor church members who had died in World War II. The group featured a crucified Christ, three women, and two angels. The sculptures were set on brick and concrete pedestals, with a bronze plaque attached to the main pedestal. When St. Margaret of Hungary Church moved to Orange, Ohio, in 1989, the statue group was relocated as well. The church closed in November 2009, and the diocese removed the statuary group a month later. Initially, the diocese intended to disperse the statuary group among several cemeteries. After months of discussion with former St. Margaret parishioners, the diocese agreed to reinstall the complete grouping near the cemetery's 116th Street entrance, where many World War II dead are buried. The cost of the installation was $30,000 ($44,293 in 2025 dollars), and the memorial rededicated in mid-September 2010.

== Notable interments ==
- Frank J. Battisti (1922–1994), judge for the Northern District of Ohio.
- Gene Carroll (1897–1972), actor, musician, comedian, and host of the long-running local television series The Gene Carroll Show.
- Kathleen Daly Chapman McMahon (1893–1926), and Rae Marie Chapman (1921–1929), the widow and daughter (respectively) of Ray Chapman. Chapman is the only Major League Baseball player to die as the result of being hit by a pitched ball. Kathleen and Rae are buried together.
- Michael Corcoran (d. 1919), Medal of Honor recipient, Indian Wars.
- Ed Delahanty (1867–1903), Hall of Fame baseball player.
- Danny Greene (1933–1977), mobster
- Anton Grdina (1874–1957), community activist, first American to receive Yugoslavia's highest civil honor (Third Order of the Crown).
- Frank Lausche (1895–1990), Cleveland mayor, Ohio governor and Senator.
- Angelo Lonardo (1911–2006), underboss of the Cleveland Mafia
- Joseph Lonardo (1884–1927), boss of the Cleveland Mafia
- Helena Pelczar (1888–1926), Catholic stigmatist with an open beatification process.
- John R. Towle (1924–1944), U.S. Army World War II Medal of Honor recipient.
- Stanisława Walasiewicz (Stella Walsh) (1911–1980), controversial Olympic gold medalist.
- Bill Wambsganss (1894–1985), baseball player who made the only unassisted triple play in World Series history.
- Frankie Yankovic (1915–1998), musician known as "The Polka King".
- Antanas Smetona (1874–1944), first President of Lithuania.
- Frank Joseph Petrarca (1918-1943), U.S Army World War II Medal of Honor recipient.

== Bibliography ==
- Anderson, Sheldon R. (2017). The Forgotten Legacy of Stella Walsh: The Greatest Female Athlete of Her Time. Lanham, Md.: Rowman & Littlefield. ISBN 9781442277564.
- Avery, Elroy McKendree (1918). A History of Cleveland and Its Environs: The Heart of New Connecticut. Volume 2. Chicago: Lewis Publishing Co.
- The Catholic Encyclopedia. Volume 4. New York: Robert Appleton Company. 1908.
- Christiansen, Harry E. (1975). Trolley Trails Through Greater Cleveland and Northern Ohio. Vol. 2: From 1910 Until Today. Cleveland: Western Reserve Historical Society. OCLC 2226901.
- Hynes, Michael J. (1953). History of the Diocese of Cleveland: Origin and Growth, 1847-1952. Cleveland: Diocese of Cleveland.
- Odenkirk, James Ellis (2005). Frank J. Lausche: Ohio's Great Political Maverick. Welmington, Ohio: Orange Frazer Press. ISBN 9781882203499.
- Orth, Samuel P. (1910). A History of Cleveland, Ohio. Volume 2. Chicago: S.J. Clarke Publishing.
- Orth, Samuel P. (1910). A History of Cleveland, Ohio. Volume 3. Chicago: S.J. Clarke Publishing.
- Sanders, Craig (2014). Cleveland Mainline Railroads. Charleston, S.C.: Arcadia Publishing. ISBN 9781467111379.
- Vigil, Vicki Blum (2007). Cemeteries of Northeast Ohio: Stones, Symbols and Stories. Cleveland: Gray & Company. ISBN 9781598510256.
- Visser, Rebecca Deck; Jayne, Renee Ciminillo (2014). Toledo's Woodlawn Cemetery. Charleston, S.C.: Arcadia Publishing. ISBN 9781467112956.
- Wilson, Scott; Mank, Gregory W. (2016). Resting Places: The Burial Sites of More Than 14,000 Famous Persons. Jefferson, N.C.: McFarland & Company. ISBN 9780786479924.
