= Tonawanda City School District =

School district in the U.S. state of New York

District information
- Type: Public
- Schools: 2

Students and staff
- Students: teachers

Other information
- Unions: NYSUT
- Website: www.tonawandacsd.org

Tonawanda City School District is a public school district that serves the City of Tonawanda, New York. The school district consists of 1,850 students in grades PreK-12 (one elementary school, one 6-8 middle school, and one 9-12 high school.). The district superintendent is Timothy A. Oldenburg, Ed.D.

== Schools ==
=== Current Schools ===
- Tonawanda Elementary School
- Tonawanda Middle/High School

=== Former schools ===
- Delaware Elementary School (Built in 1925) Dedicated on September 16, 1926, and closed on July 1, 1980
- Fletcher Elementary School (Built in 1936) Cornerstone laid on June 27, 1936. Opened on February 12, 1937, and dedicated on February 26, 1937
- Highland Elementary School (Built in 1923) Dedicated on September 14, 1923. Closed in June 2009
- Kibler Junior-Senior High School (Built in 1925) Cornerstone laid on June 26, 1925. Opened on September 8, 1926, dedicated on December 10, 1926, and closed at the end of the 1982–1983 school year
- Millstream Elementary School - Opened in September 1966 and closed in June 1976
- Mullen Elementary School (Built in 1956) Opened on September 4, 1957, and closed on June 16, 2023
- Niagara Elementary School (Built in 1923) Opened in 1923 and closed in June 1976
- Riverview Elementary School (Built in 1956) Opened on September 4, 1957, and closed on June 16, 2023
