= Tonawanda, New York =

Tonawanda Tahnawáteh (Tuscarora)
- City
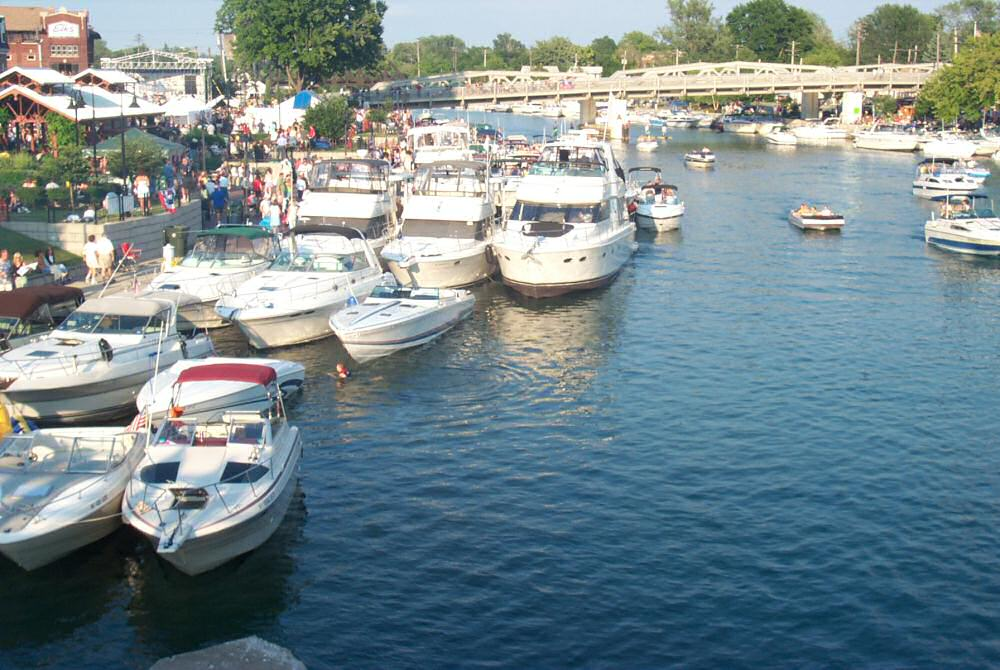
- The North Tonawanda side of the Gateway Harbor

- Flag Seal

- Location of Tonawanda in Erie County and New York

- Location within the United States
- Coordinates: 43°0′40″N 78°52′39″W
- Country: United States
- State: New York
- County: Erie

Government
  - Type: Mayor-Council
  - Mayor: Bill Strassburg (D)
  - Common Council: Members' List: President: • Jenna Koch (D); • W1: Thomas Newman (R); • W2: Dawn Kammerdeiner (D); • W3: Sean Rautenstrauch (D); • W4: David R. Mileham (D)

Area
  - Total: 4.09 sq mi (10.60 km^{2})
  - Land: 3.80 sq mi (9.85 km^{2})
  - Water: 0.29 sq mi (0.75 km^{2})
- Elevation: 571 ft (174 m)

Population (2020)
  - Total: 15,129
  - Density: 3,977.9/sq mi (1,535.87/km^{2})
- Time zone: UTC−5 (EST)
  - Summer (DST): UTC−4 (EDT)
- ZIP code: 14150
- Area code: 716
- FIPS code: 36-74166
- GNIS feature ID: 0979550
- Website: tonawandacity.com

Tonawanda is a city in Erie County, New York, United States. The population was 15,129 at the 2020 census. It is at the northern edge of Erie County, south across the Erie Canal (Tonawanda Creek) from North Tonawanda, east of Grand Island, and north of Buffalo. It is part of the Buffalo-Niagara Falls metropolitan area.

== History ==
The city's name is from the word Tahnawá•teh in Tuscarora meaning 'confluent stream'.

Post-Revolutionary War white settlement at Tonawanda began with Henry Anguish, who built a log home in 1808. He added to the hamlet in 1811 with a tavern, both on the south side of Tonawanda Creek where it empties into the Niagara River. The hamlet grew slowly until the opening of the Erie Canal, completed in the course of the creek in 1825. The Town of Tonawanda was incorporated in 1836. The Erie Canal and the railroads that soon followed it provided economic opportunity. By the end of the 19th century, both sides of the canal were devoted to businesses as part of a leading lumber processing center. In the mid-19th century, the business center of Tonawanda was incorporated as a village within the town. The village united in a corporation with North Tonawanda across the canal. This corporation fell apart, and in 1904 the village was incorporated as the City of Tonawanda.

On September 26, 1898, a tornado struck the City of Tonawanda. After crossing over the river from Grand Island, the tornado damaged the old Murray School as well as several homes along Franklin and Kohler streets. Its worst havoc was wreaked along Fuller Avenue, where a dozen homes were severely damaged, several being leveled to the ground. No one was killed by the fierce storm, but there were numerous injuries.

=== Goose Island ===
From the mid-19th century to the early 20th century, a section of Tonawanda was known as Goose Island. Goose Island was a man-made island in the Niagara River formed by the Erie Canal. Goose Island was a triangular piece of land bordered on one side by the Niagara River, on the second side by the Tonawanda Creek, and on the third by the Erie Canal. It was then famous with seamen the world over as the terminus of the Erie Canal and for the Goose Island girls. The Goose Island Section of Tonawanda had many cheap boarding houses, cheap hotels, bars, and brothels. Canalers often wintered over on Goose Island. Goose Island was known as a bad section of Tonawanda, with drunkenness, brawling, and bawdy displays being commonplace. The gentrification of Goose Island began with the decline of the lumbering port business in Tonawanda and the building of a boxboard mill there on the island. Then the canal was motorized, eliminating the need for mules and for many canal men. Next the section of the canal from Tonawanda to Buffalo was abandoned in 1918. That section of the canal was filled in and Goose Island was no longer an island. The establishments in the Goose Island section of Tonawanda came under community pressure in the 1920s and 1930s and were closed, with more of the land there being given over to the boxboard mill. In the 1970s the boxboard mill closed and was razed along with many remaining Goose Island structures. Goose Island street names Tonawanda, First, Clay and Chestnut disappeared. At the turn of the millennium waterfront dwellings were built along the Niagara River, completing the gentrification of this area.

=== Spaulding Fibre ===
Spaulding Fibre became a manufacturer of leatherboard (made from leather scraps and wood pulp), transformer board, vulcanized fibre, bakelite (under the trade name Spauldite) and Filawound (fiberglass) tube. Operating in Tonawanda from 1911 to 1992, it became the major employer in the city. The company was founded in 1873 with a leatherboard mill by Jonas Spaulding and his brother Waldo in Townsend Harbor, Massachusetts. They did business as The Spaulding Brothers Company. Jonas Spaulding had three sons: Leon C., Huntley N. and Rolland H.

With industry expanding, Jonas established leatherboard mills at Milton and North Rochester, New Hampshire, in part to allow his sons to join him in the business. The New Hampshire mills operated under the name J. Spaulding and Sons. After Jonas Spaulding's death in 1900, his sons (by then living in New Hampshire, where they had corporate headquarters at Rochester) continued to operate these mills successfully. They brought the Townsend Harbor mill under the J. Spaulding and Sons banner in 1902.

With continued success, the three Spaulding brothers added a vulcanized fibre operation in Tonawanda, New York in 1911. They added a fourth leatherboard mill in Milton (second in this community) in 1913. The mayor of Tonawanda, Charles Zuckmaier, had solicited the Spaulding brothers' business in Tonawanda. A ground-breaking ceremony was held on July 17, 1911, for the new plant, a $600,000 investment by J. Spaulding and Sons. Operations began on April 1, 1912, with 40 employees. The daily capacity of the plant at the time was five tons of fibre sheeting and one ton of fibre tubing.

Around 1924, the sons changed the name of the company to the Spaulding Fibre Company. In the 1930s, they added a second product at the Tonawanda plant: Spauldite, a "me too" phenol formaldehyde resin material made to compete with Bakelite. The trademark now owned by Spaulding Composites can be applied to laminates made with other natural or synthetic resins as well.

After Huntley Spaulding, the last of the three brothers, died in November 1955, the Spaulding Fibre Company became part of a charitable trust previously set up by Huntley and his only sister, Marion S. Potter. The trust was created to disburse their remaining wealth within 15 years of the death of the last sibling. Marion S. Potter died on September 27, 1957.

The company in Tonawanda flourished under foremen, superintendents and workers from the local blue collar workforce. It also attracted new residents who came for the jobs. One was Richard Spencer, who left the oil fields of Bradford, Pennsylvania, to be a superintendent for two decades. He managed through several labor strikes and periods of economic unrest for the company.

In 1956, the Tonawanda plant completed an expansion that doubled the paper mill and the vulcanized fibre-making capacity of the plant. In addition, after the death of Huntley Spaulding, corporate offices relocated to Wheeler Street from Rochester, New Hampshire. In the 1960s, the Tonawanda plant added a third product line, Filawound (fiberglass) tubing.

The 50th anniversary of the Wheeler Street Plant in 1961 was marked by a special 22-page section in the Tonawanda News. The Wheeler Street Plant reportedly covered 610,000 square feet (57,000 m^{2}), employed 1,500 workers, and had an annual payroll of $9,000,000. The company paid $153,818 in city taxes that year and was Tonawanda's largest taxpayer. The plant was nearing its peak, but there was more expansion to come.

In 1966, the charitable trust sold the Spaulding Fibre Company to Monogram Industries. The Tonawanda plant began a slow decline during a period of industrial restructuring and product and manufacturing changes. In 1984, Monogram Industries sold the Spaulding Fibre Company to Nortek. In 1988, Nortek changed the company name to Spaulding Composites. Spaulding Composites closed the Tonawanda plant on August 24, 1992.

By the time the plant closed, employment had declined to 300. Since the closure of the Tonawanda plant, Spaulding Composites twice filed for bankruptcy. The plant site had a footprint of 860,000 square feet (80,000 m^{2}). It fell into disrepair and, because of the wastes of the industrial processes, was classified as a brown field site under environmental regulations.

In 2006, the Erie County Development Agency contracted for demolition of the derelict facilities. It was punctuated by the felling of the 250-foot (76 m)-tall smoke stack that dominated the site. (This event is documented with a handful of videos on YouTube.) Cleanup of the site was declared complete in August 2010.

== Geography ==
According to the United States Census Bureau, the city has an area of 4.1 square miles (10.6 km^{2}), of which 3.8 square miles (9.8 km^{2}) is land and 0.3 square miles (0.8 km^{2}), or 7.34%, is water.

Neighborhoods include Delawanda, Gastown, Millstream, and The Hill.

== Demographics ==
Historical population
Census	Pop.	Note	%±
1870	2,812		—
1880	3,864		37.4%
1890	7,145		84.9%
1900	7,421		3.9%
1910	8,290		11.7%
1920	10,068		21.4%
1930	12,681		26.0%
1940	13,008		2.6%
1950	14,617		12.4%
1960	21,561		47.5%
1970	21,898		1.6%
1980	18,693		−14.6%
1990	17,284		−7.5%
2000	16,136		−6.6%
2010	15,130		−6.2%
2020	15,129		0.0%
U.S. Decennial Census

=== 2020 census ===
As of the 2020 census, Tonawanda had a population of 15,129. The median age was 42.5 years. 18.5% of residents were under the age of 18, and 19.4% of residents were 65 years of age or older. For every 100 females there were 95.9 males, and for every 100 females age 18 and over there were 94.2 males age 18 and over.

100.0% of residents lived in urban areas, while 0.0% lived in rural areas.

There were 6,945 households in Tonawanda, of which 22.6% had children under the age of 18 living in them. Of all households, 38.0% were married-couple households, 22.2% were households with a male householder and no spouse or partner present, and 30.6% were households with a female householder and no spouse or partner present. About 36.7% of all households were made up of individuals and 14.4% had someone living alone who was 65 years of age or older.

There were 7,365 housing units, of which 5.7% were vacant. The homeowner vacancy rate was 1.6% and the rental vacancy rate was 6.3%.

Racial composition as of the 2020 census
Race	Number	Percent
White	13,567	89.7%
Black or African American	328	2.2%
American Indian and Alaska Native	73	0.5%
Asian	172	1.1%
Native Hawaiian and Other Pacific Islander	2	0.0%
Some other race	138	0.9%
Two or more races	849	5.6%
Hispanic or Latino (of any race)	634	4.2%

=== 2000 census ===
As of the 2000 census, there were 16,136 people, 6,741 households, and 4,361 families residing in the city. The population density was 4,252.9 inhabitants per square mile (1,642.1/km^{2}). There were 7,119 housing units at an average density of 1,876.3 per square mile (724.4/km^{2}). The racial makeup of the city was 98.08% White, 0.42% Black or African American, 0.46% Native American, 0.39% Asian, 0.01% Pacific Islander, 0.17% from other races, and 0.46% from two or more races. Hispanic or Latino of any race were 0.89% of the population.

There were 6,741 households, of which 28.9% had children under the age of 18 living with them, 49.9% were married couples living together, 10.8% had a female householder with no husband present, and 35.3% were non-families. 31.2% of all households were made up of individuals, and 13.1% had someone living alone who was 65 years of age or older. The average household size was 2.39 and the average family size was 3.01.

23.9% of the population were under the age of 18, 7.6% from 18 to 24, 29.0% from 25 to 44, 22.7% from 45 to 64, and 16.8% who were 65 years of age or older. The median age was 39 years. For every 100 females, there were 94.4 males. For every 100 females age 18 and over, there were 90.2 males.

=== Income and poverty ===
The median household income was $45,721.

== Arts and culture ==
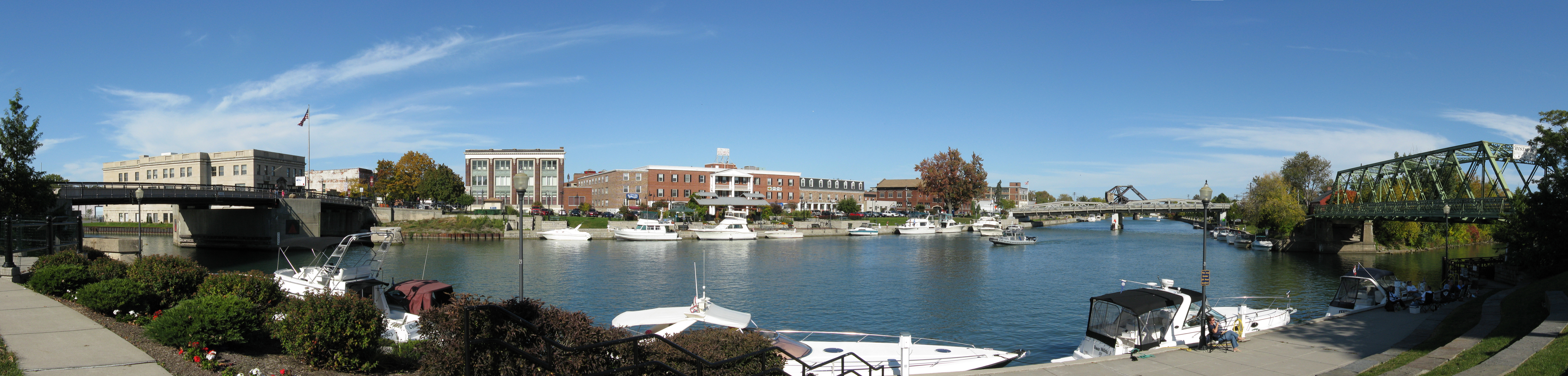
Gateway Harbor panorama

North Tonawanda and Tonawanda celebrate an annual Canal Fest of the Tonawandas, commemorating their historic location on the western end of the Erie Canal.

Gateway Harbor is a public park that runs along the Erie Canal. The park features boat docking, concerts, and vendors.

A museum located in a former New York Central and Hudson Valley Railroad station features exhibits of the area's lumber industry and Erie Canal history, and the Long Homestead, a restored Pennsylvania German-style house built in 1829 and containing period furniture from the early 19th century.

=== Historic sites ===
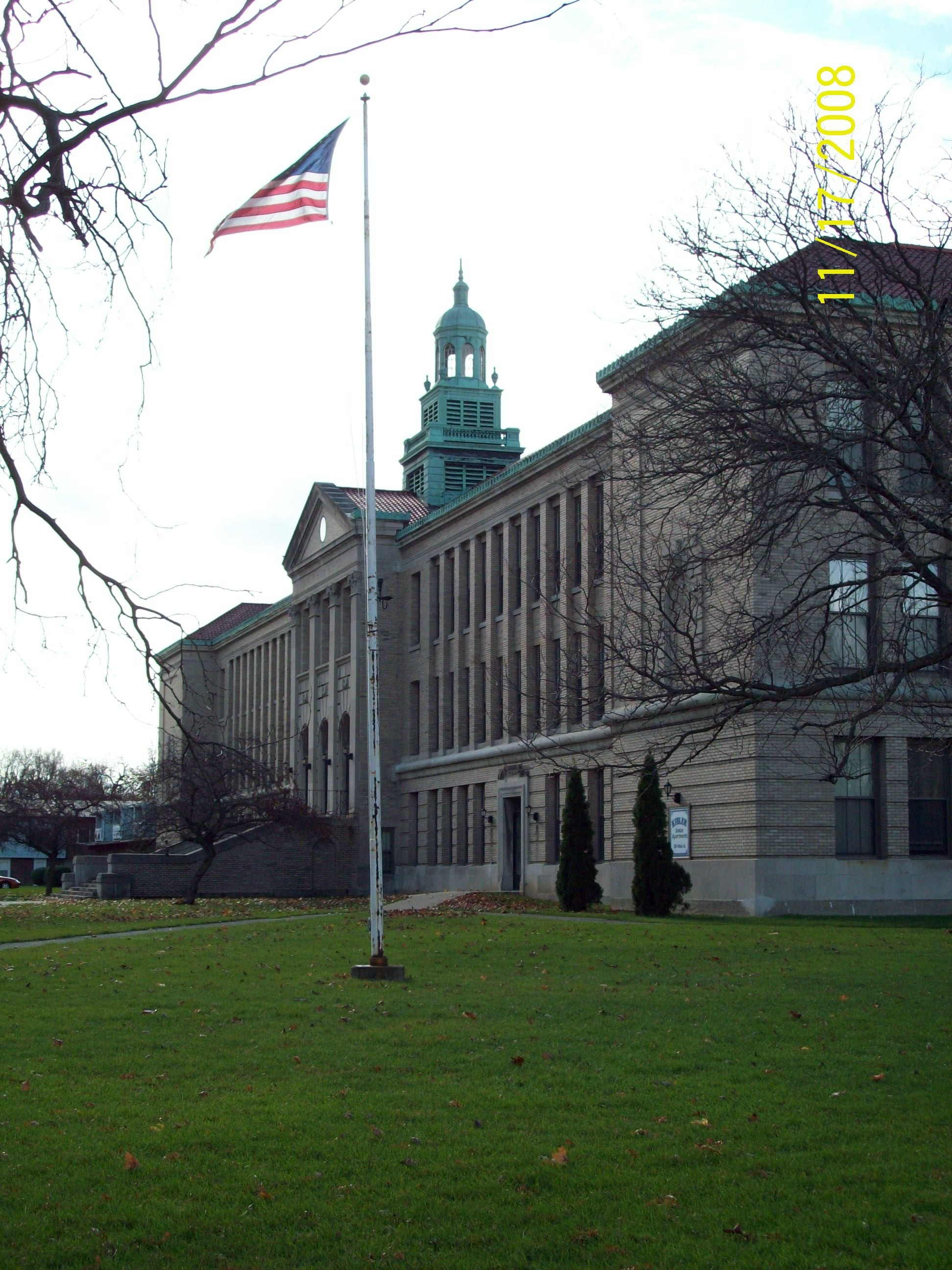
Kibler High School

The following are historic sites are listed on the National Register of Historic Places:

- Kibler High School
- Tonawanda (25th Separate Company) Armory
- US Post Office-Tonawanda

== Education ==
The school district is Tonawanda City School District.

== Sports ==
Tonawanda was home of the Tonawanda Kardex Lumbermen, a professional football team active between 1916 and 1921, best known for its brief one-game stint in the National Football League.

== Parks and recreation ==
Isle View Park, on the Niagara River overlooking Grand Island, features a recreational trail. Riverwalk trail passes through the park, and a pedestrian foot bridge connects the park to Niawanda Park.

== Infrastructure ==
=== Major highways ===
- New York State Route 265
- New York State Route 266
- New York State Route 384
- New York State Route 425

== Notable people ==
- Ockie Anderson, former NFL player
- Ronald C. Brock, adjutant general of New York
- Fred Brumm, NFL player
- John T. Bush, former New York State Senator
- Rick Cassata, retired CFL quarterback who attended Tonawanda High School
- Glen Cook, retired Texas Rangers pitcher, attended Tonawanda High School, Graduate of Ithaca College
- Jane Corwin, New York State Assemblywoman
- Darren Fenn, owner of the Buffalo eXtreme
- Dave Geisel, retired MLB player who attended Tonawanda High School
- Gregory John Hartmayer, Archbishop of Atlanta
- Frank Hinkey, member of College Football Hall of Fame
- Chris Lee, former U.S. Congressman
- Bert Lewis, former MLB pitcher
- Richard Matt, convicted felon, prison escapee
- Sam Melville, bombing conspirator
- Joe Mesi, retired boxer
- Blake Miller, former football head coach of Central Michigan Chippewas
- Warren H. Muck, Member of famed Easy Company 506th, 101st.
- John Neumann, first American bishop to be canonized
- Niland brothers, notable World War II soldiers
- Marc Panepinto, New York State Senator
- Phillip Louis (Phil) Perew, Lake boat captain, inventor, sporting promoter, landlord of notorious establishments on Goose Island in Tonawanda
- Thomas Perry, author
- Bobby Shuttleworth, MLS goalkeeper
- John Simson Woolson, former Federal judge
- Jules Yakapovich, longtime Kenmore West High School football coach
