= 325th Infantry Regiment =

US Army unit

325th Regiment 325th Glider Infantry Regiment 325th Infantry 325th Infantry Regiment
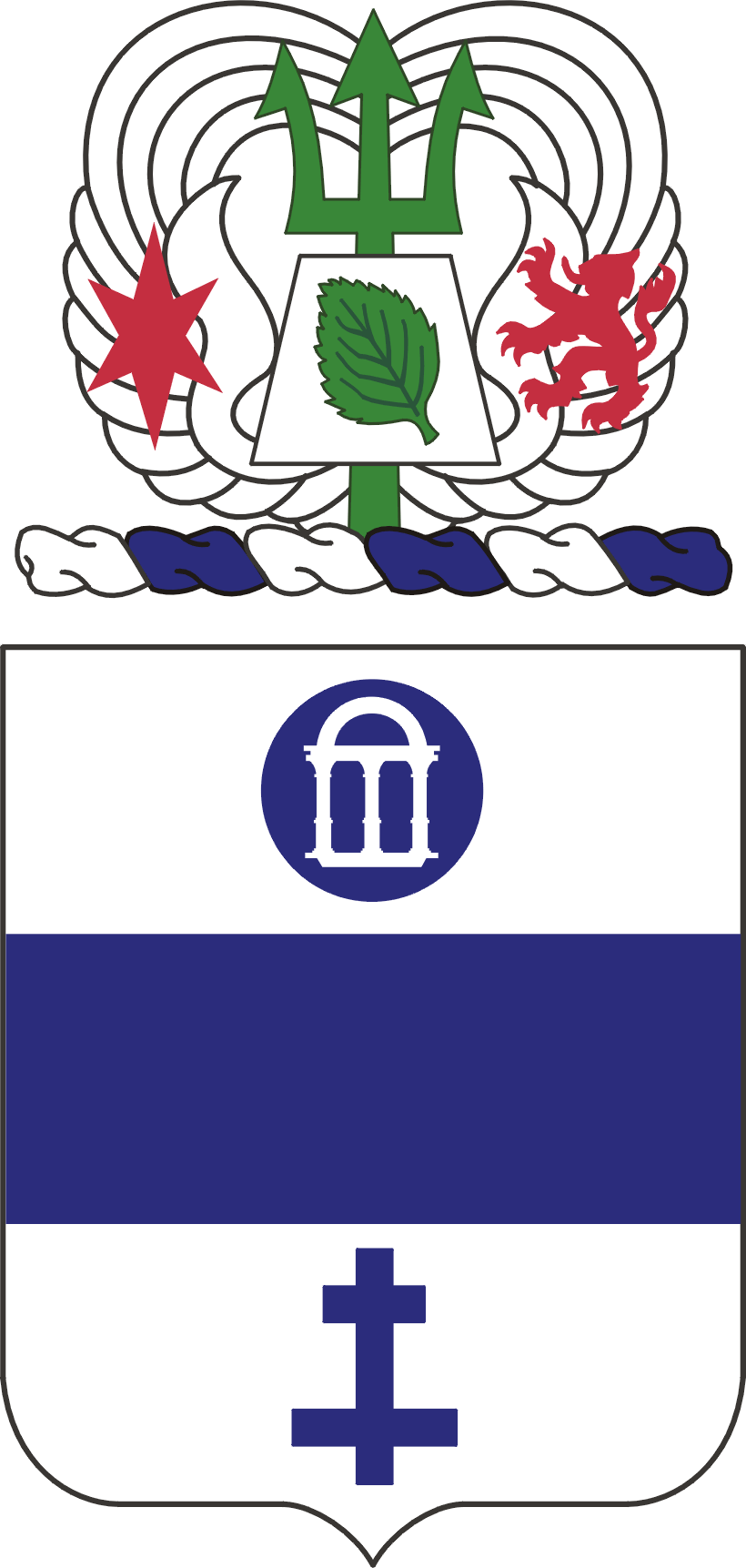
- Coat of arms of the 325th Infantry Regiment
- Active: 1917–1919; 1921–1946; 1947–present
- Country: United States
- Branch: United States Army
- Type: Airborne forces
- Size: Regiment
- Part of: 82nd Airborne Division
- Garrison/HQ: Fort Bragg, North Carolina
- Nickname: Falcons
- Motto: Let's Go
- Engagements: World War I World War II: Landing at Salerno; Operation Overlord; Operation Market Garden; Battle of the Bulge; Western Allied invasion of Germany; Operation Power Pack; Vietnam War; Operation Urgent Fury; Operation Just Cause; Operation Desert Storm; Operation Iraqi Freedom; Operation Enduring Freedom; Operation Inherent Resolve

Commanders
- Notable commanders: Charles Billingslea

Insignia
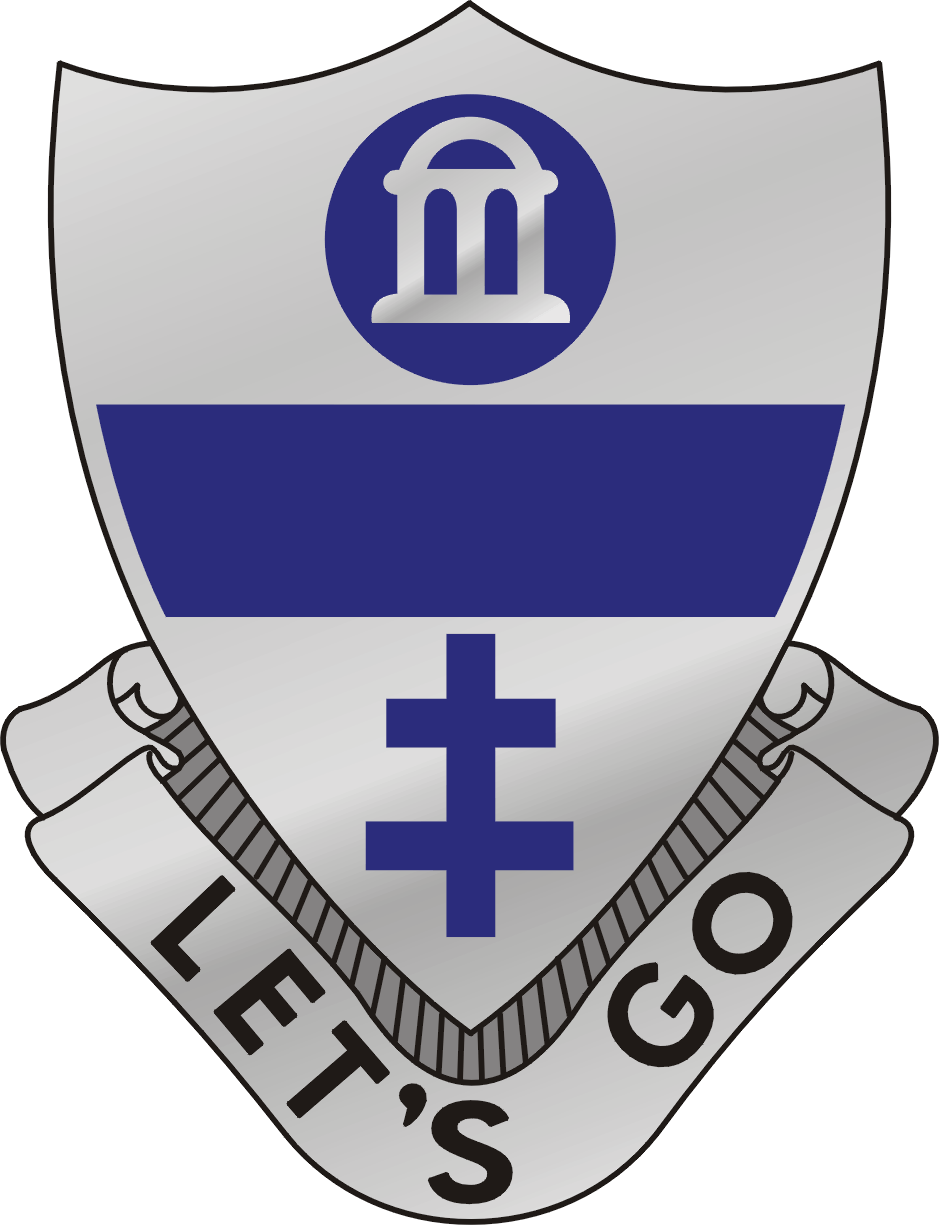
- Distinctive unit insignia

- Beret flashes of the 1st and 2nd Battalion, 325th Infantry Regiment

The 325th Infantry Regiment is an infantry regiment of the 82nd Airborne Division. It has a long and distinguished history, having taken part in World War I, World War II, the Vietnam War, the invasions of Grenada and Panama, as well as the Gulf and Iraq Wars.

Presently, battalions of the regiment constitute the bulk of the infantry elements assigned to the 2nd Infantry Brigade Combat Team, 82nd Airborne Division, serving as the division’s parachute-insertable light infantry force. The 325th Airborne Infantry Regiment is capable of deploying anywhere in the world within 18 hours of notification, and is trained to conduct forced-entry parachute assaults to seize, retain, and defend airfields or other assets, then increases combat power in order to control land, people, and resources.

== History ==
=== World War I ===
The 325th Infantry Regiment was activated in the National Army on 25 August 1917, almost five months after the American entry into World War I. The regiment was part of the 82nd Division. Under the command of Colonel Walter M. Whitman, a professional Regular Army officer, the regiment, which was composed of large numbers of wartime volunteers and conscripts, also known as draftees, trained at Camp Gordon, Georgia as part of the 164th Infantry Brigade of the 82nd Division. However, only a small cadre of professional Regular Army soldiers were originally assigned to the 325th. The cadre was intended to train the many hundreds of new conscripts, most of whom recently called up and were very young and had had no prior military service, who would soon be entering the camp.

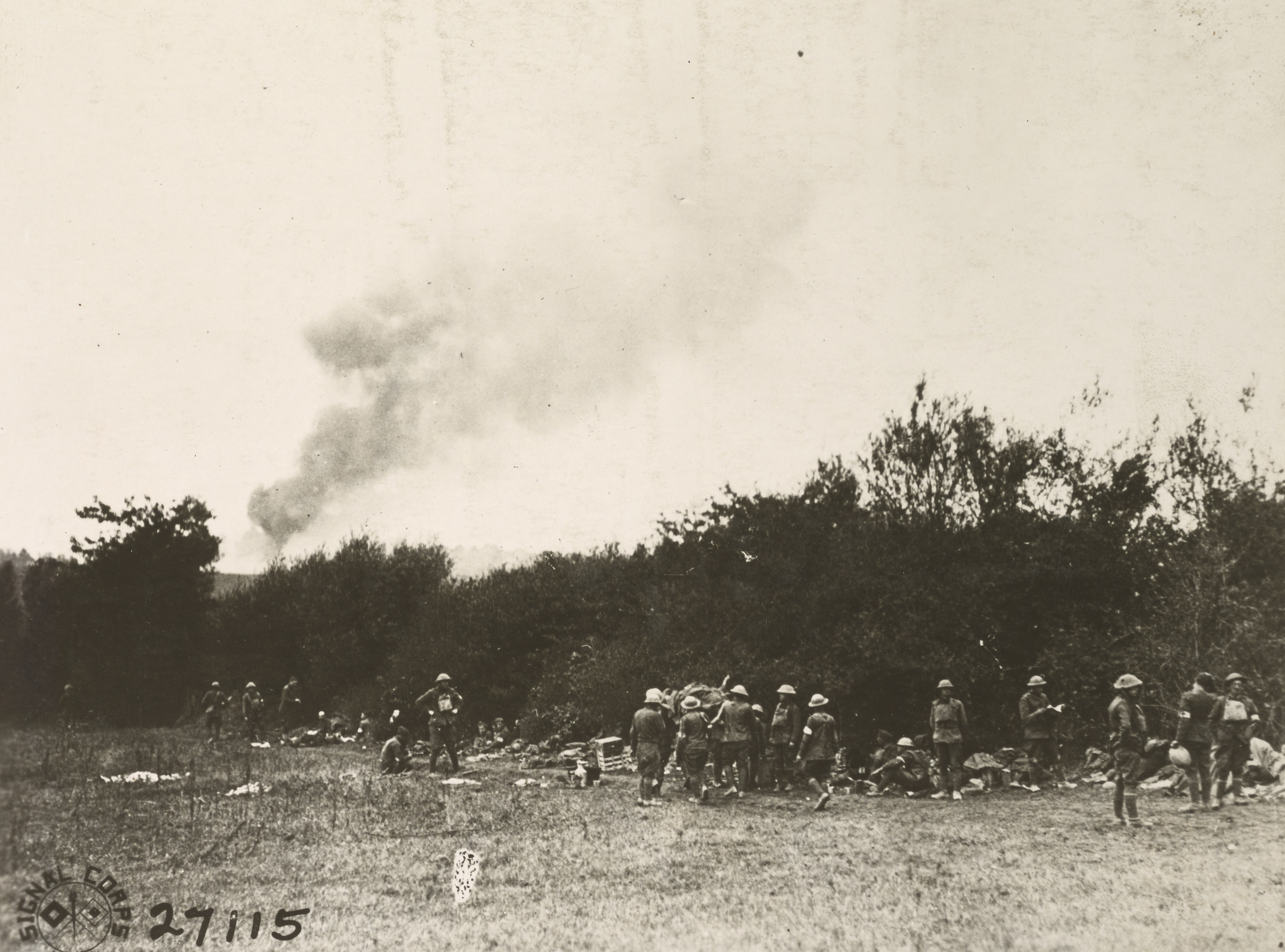
Scene at advanced first-aid station of the 325th Infantry Regiment, 82nd Division. The wounded arrive on stretchers while in the background a German munitions dump is burning at Marcq, American Red Cross. North of Fléville, Ardennes, France, October 1918.

The 325th, along with the 326th Infantry Regiment, which also formed part of the 164th Infantry Brigade, was composed of men from the "Deep South". Soon after, the 82nd Division was instructed by the War Department to send its men to other camps in order to help create other units. This left the regiment with only a small training cadre of just under 800 officers and men. They were replaced by conscripts from all 48 states, giving rise to the 82nd Division's nickname of the "All Americans".

After further training in France, the regiment was committed to Toul sector from 18 June - 10 August 1918. After a brief rest, the regiment returned to the line to participate in the offensive to reduce the St. Mihiel salient, securing the southern shoulder of the breach.

From 26 September - 9 October 1918, the regiment waited to be committed to the Meuse–Argonne offensive. At 07:00 on 10 October, the regiment attacked to seize the Cornay Ridge, then continued the attack across the Aire River. Following the Armistice of 11 November 1918, the regiment returned to the United States aboard the USS Alaskan and was demobilized on 18 May 1919 at Camp Upton, New York.

=== Interwar period ===
The 325th Infantry Regiment was reconstituted in the Organized Reserve on 24 June 1921, assigned to the 82nd Division, and allotted to the Fourth Corps Area. The regiment was initiated on 14 December 1921 with regimental headquarters at Albany, Georgia. Subordinate battalion headquarters were concurrently organized as follows: 1st Battalion at Columbus, Georgia; 2nd Battalion at Waycross, Georgia; and the 3rd Battalion at Savannah, Georgia. The regiment conducted summer training most years with the 8th Infantry Regiment at Fort Screven, Georgia, and some years with the 22nd Infantry Regiment at Camp McClellan, Alabama, or Fort McPherson, Georgia. Also conducted infantry Citizens Military Training Camps some years at Camp McClellan, Fort Screven, Fort Moultrie, South Carolina, or Camp Beauregard, Louisiana, as an alternate form of summer training. The primary ROTC feeder school for new Reserve lieutenants for the regiment was the University of Georgia, in Albany.

=== World War II ===
Drawing of the WWII 325th Glider Infantry Regiment's Glider Badge with regiment specific airborne background trimming

The 325th Infantry was ordered into active military service during World War II on 25 March 1942, forming under the command of Colonel Claudius M. Easley at Camp Claiborne, Louisiana. After initial training, the regiment was reorganized as a glider infantry unit when the 82nd Infantry Division was reorganized as the 82nd Airborne Division in August 1942, and the 325th was redesignated the 325th Glider Infantry Regiment.

After further training, the regiment deployed to North Africa under the command of Colonel Harry L. Lewis. The regiment was not committed to combat until they conducted a landing at Salerno, Italy, on 15 September 1943. It was not, however, by glider but by landing craft

After service in the Italian campaign, the regiment deployed to England and conducted further training in preparation for Operation Overlord. Conducting a glider-borne assault on 7 June 1944, the day after the initial Normandy landings, the regiment fought in Normandy for over a month, sustaining heavy casualties before being withdrawn to England. On 9 June 1944 the 325th earned its first and only Medal of Honor of the war, belonging to Private First Class Charles N. DeGlopper.

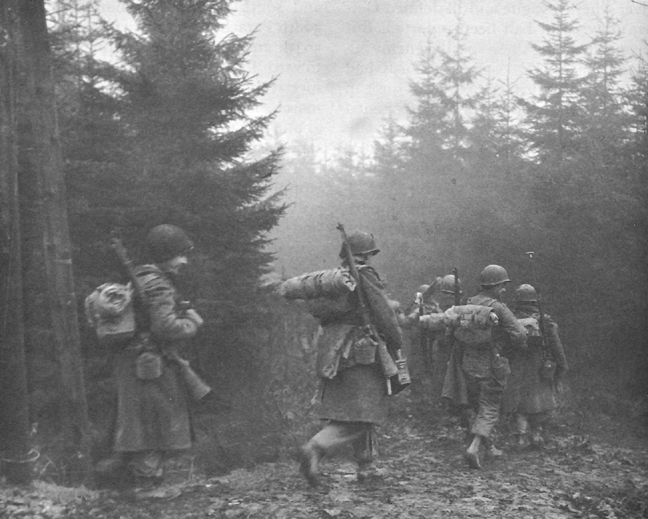
Men of the 325th Glider Infantry Regiment moving through fog to a new position, Belgium, December 1944.

Committed to another glider-borne assault in September 1944, the regiment fought in Holland as part of Operation Market Garden and later saw service in the Battle of the Bulge under Colonel Charles Billingslea.

=== Post World War II ===
After the war the regiment was reorganized and redesignated, 15 December 1947, as Company A, 325th Infantry Regiment. (Organized Reserves redesignated 25 March 1948 as the Organized Reserve Corps.)

Withdrawn 15 November 1948 from the Organized Reserve Corps and allotted to the Regular Army. Reorganized and redesignated 15 December 1948 as Company A, 325th Airborne Infantry Regiment.

Reorganized and redesignated 1 September 1957 as Headquarters and Headquarters Company, 1st Airborne Battle Group, 325th Infantry Regiment, and remained assigned to the 82nd Airborne Division (organic elements concurrently constituted and activated).

The regiment was again reorganized and redesignated on 25 May 1964 as the 325th Infantry Regiment.

==== Cold War ====
The regiment returned to the 82nd Airborne Division on 15 December 1948 and was redesignated this time the 325th Airborne Infantry Regiment. On 1 May 1965, the 325th deployed to the revolution torn Dominican Republic as part of Operation Power Pack. Sent with the mission of relieving marines and evacuating civilians, the regiment swept from the San Isidro Air Base into the capital city of Santo Domingo, neutralizing rebel forces. By the end of May, all resistance had crumbled and the regiment began peacekeeping and civil affairs operations.

When the army's regimental system began affiliating separate units with existing regiments The 1-509th based in Vicenza Italy was re-flagged as the 4-325 Airborne Battalion Combat Team (ABCT) Part of the NATO's Southern European Task Force (SETAF) In June 1986 The 4-325 began to rotate to Ft Bragg NC as the 3-325 rotated to Italy to assume the duties of the ABCT. During the Cold War the 3-325th ABCT was called upon to prepare/deploy as a rapid strike force to secure hostile airfields for follow on forces in several scenarios in the middle east including Operation Prime Chance in 1987.

==== Operation Urgent Fury ====
On 25 October 1983, as part of Operation Urgent Fury, the 325th Airborne Infantry Regiment spearheaded the 82nd Airborne's assault on the Communist dominated island of Grenada. Landing at Point Salines Airfield, the 2nd and 3rd Battalions in conjunction with other U.S. forces overwhelmed all resistance within three days. One hundred thirty eight students were rescued. During this operation, Bravo Company, Second Battalion was given the mission to assault an area known as Little Havana. The Commander of Bravo Company, Captain Michael Ritz, decided to conduct a reconnaissance prior to the assault.

At 04:30 on 26 October, Captain Ritz and his recon patrol were ambushed. Captain Ritz and SSG Gary Epps were killed but the rest of the patrol, although wounded, survived. Bravo Company soon discovered large caches of weapons and equipment.

==== Operation Just Cause ====
In December 1989, the 4th Battalion "Gold Falcons" conducted a night parachute assault onto Torrijos International Airport in the Republic of Panama, during Operation Just Cause, the United States invasion of Panama. This operation represented the first combat parachute assault by a unit of the 82nd Airborne Division since Vietnam War. The battalion was to jump, assemble, and perform a helicopter assault to Fort Cimmarron to secure the garrison. While this was taking place, Delta Company was tasked to stay behind and secure another airport within Panama City.

==== Gulf War ====
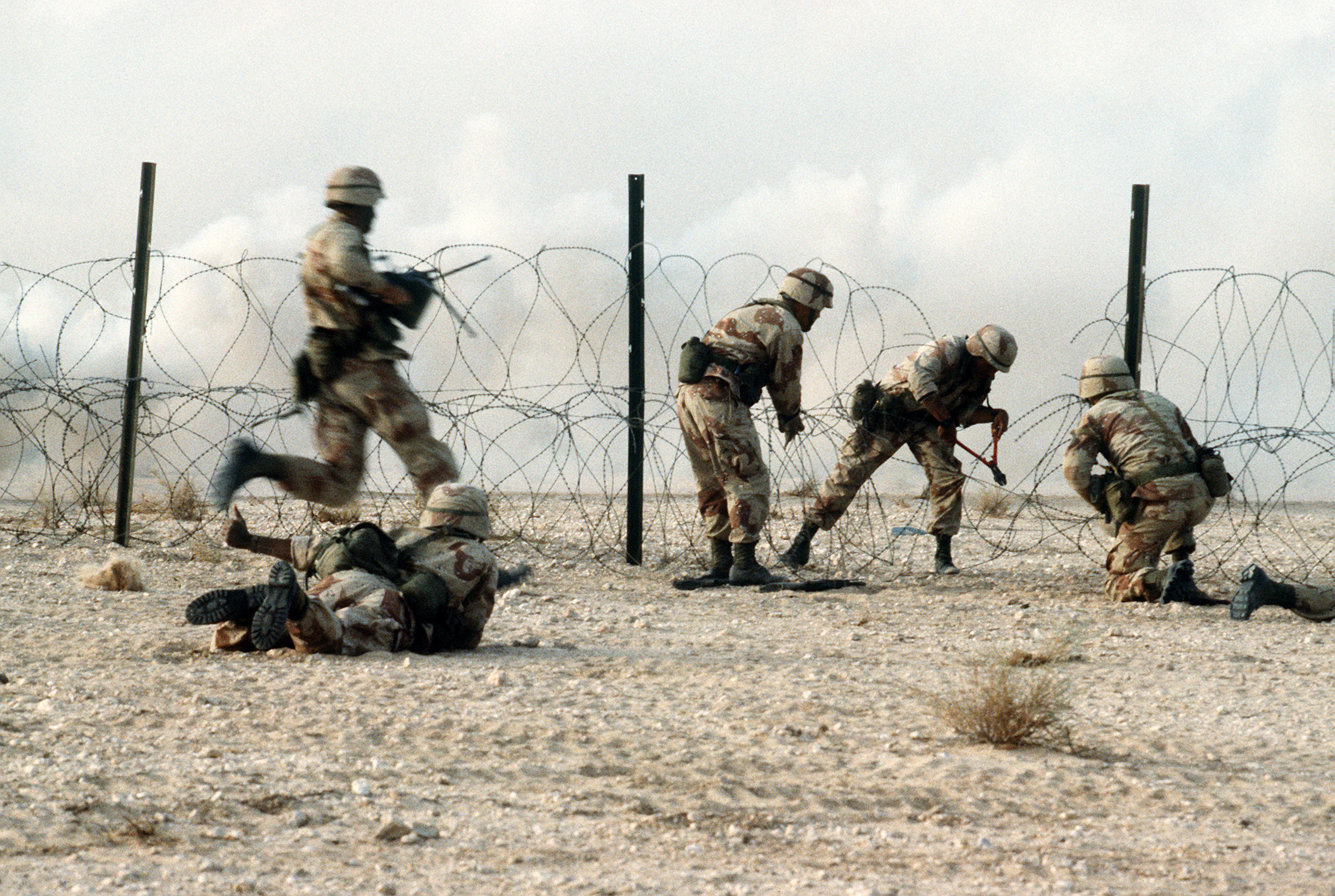
Members of the regiment in a live fire demonstration during Operation Desert Shield.

In August 1990, as Division Ready Force (DRF) 1 for the 82nd Airborne Division, the 4-325 was called on to spearhead the deployment of U.S. forces to the Persian Gulf in response to the Iraqi Invasion of Kuwait. Their mission was to secure the area north of the approach to Al Jubayl, [Saudi Arabia] and keep secure the approach to Al Jubayl until US Marine Forces arrived later in August. While reinforcements streamed into the country, the 325th along with the remainder of the 82nd Airborne Division conducted the most intensive combat trainup in the unit's history.

In mid-January, after the air war had begun, the 82nd Airborne Division displaced nearly 650 miles (1,050 km) to the northwest near the Iraqi border in preparation for the commencement of the ground war. On 22 February, a day before the official start of the ground war - Task Force Falcon which comprised the 2-325 and attached elements of the XVIII Airborne Corps along with soldiers of the French 6th Light Armored Brigade began their drive into Iraq and were responsible for the destruction of massive amounts of enemy weapons, equipment, and ammunition. The 1-325 and 4-325, as trailing elements, were responsible for the capture of several thousand Iraqi soldiers. The division is credited with playing a major role in the highly successful 100-hour ground war. The first division elements began redeploying to Fort Bragg on 7 March, and by early April the redeployment of the division was complete.

=== Operation Provide Comfort ===
On 19 April 1991, the 3-325 ABCT, stationed in Caserma Ederle, Vicenza, Italy and attached to the Southern European Task Force (SETAF), commanded by Lt. Col. (later General) John P. Abizaid, deployed to Northern Iraq as part of Operation Provide Comfort to secure from the 36th parallel to the northern border of Iraq and protect the Kurdish population from Saddam Hussein's brutality. Saddam Hussein's regime had previously murdered Kurds by using chemical gas and other means, causing the Kurds to retreat to the mountains of Northern Iraq and Turkey and to assist U.S. forces during the Gulf War. The U.S. and its allies were worried that Hussein's regime would seek revenge on the Kurds for assisting the Americans. The 3-325's effort to secure the Kurds over a large expanse of territory during Operation Provide Comfort earned the battalion a Joint Meritorious Unit Award. The unit only lost one soldier in Provide Comfort, Specialist Lars Chew, attached to the recon squad, who was killed in a landmine incident.

=== Kosovo Humanitarian Mission ===
The 3-325th infantrymen began arriving in Tuzla, Bosnia-Herzegovina on 18 December 1995, to set up perimeter security, which completed the first in a series of steps paving the way for the arrival of thousands of NATO troops. 3-325th ABCT was the lead element for Task Force Eagle, part of Operation Joint Endeavor.

After serving as the primary protection force for Eagle Base, Tuzla, Bosnia-Herzegovina since mid-December 1995, members of the 3rd Battalion, 325th Infantry (Airborne Combat Team), began to return to their home base of Vicenza, Italy.

The first contingent of about 80 soldiers, began leaving 31 January 1996. They included soldiers in D Battery, Airborne Field Artillery.

More than 800 members of the 3-325th ABCT landed on Bosnian soil, bringing with them artillery, engineers, transportation and cooks that all helped prepare Eagle Base, Tuzla, for the onslaught of soldiers moving through the base and into the US sector.

During its stay, A Company temporarily operated an observation point in the Serbian sector on the zone of separation. From here the unit kept watch, monitoring for possible illegal troop movement in the zone.

3-325 ABCT Stationed in Vicenza, Italy with SETAF" Campaign: Operation Provide Comfort, deployed 19 April 1991, a Humanitarian mission in Northern Iraq to secure the 36 parallel to the north border of Iraq. In the northern area Saddam Hussein's regime brutally murdered the Kurds using chemical weapons after the Kurds and PKK tried to help the United States overthrow Saddam Hussein's regime during the Gulf War. The unit earned a Humanitarian Ribbon and Congressional Medal of Honor for its service in Operation Provide Comfort.

Kosovo campaign

The 3-325th Infantry began arriving in Tuzla, Bosnia-Herzegovina on 18 December 1995, to set up perimeter security, which completed the first in a series of steps paving the way for the arrival of thousands of NATO troops. 3-325th ABCT was the lead element for Task Force Eagle, part of Operation Joint Endeavor.

After serving as the primary protection force for Eagle Base, Tuzla, Bosnia-Herzegovina since mid-December 1995, members of the 3rd Battalion, 325th Infantry (Airborne Combat Team), began to return to their home base of Vicenza, Italy.

The first contingent of about 80 soldiers, began leaving 31 January 1996. They included soldiers in D Battery, 319th Airborne Field Artillery.

More than 800 members of the 3-325th ABCT landed on Bosnian soil, bringing with them artillery, engineers, transportation and cooks that all helped prepare Eagle Base, Tuzla, for the onslaught of soldiers moving through the base and into the US sector.

During its stay, Company A temporarily operated an observation point in the Russian sector on the zone of separation. From here the unit kept watch, monitoring for possible illegal troop movement in the zone.

=== Iraq and Afghanistan ===
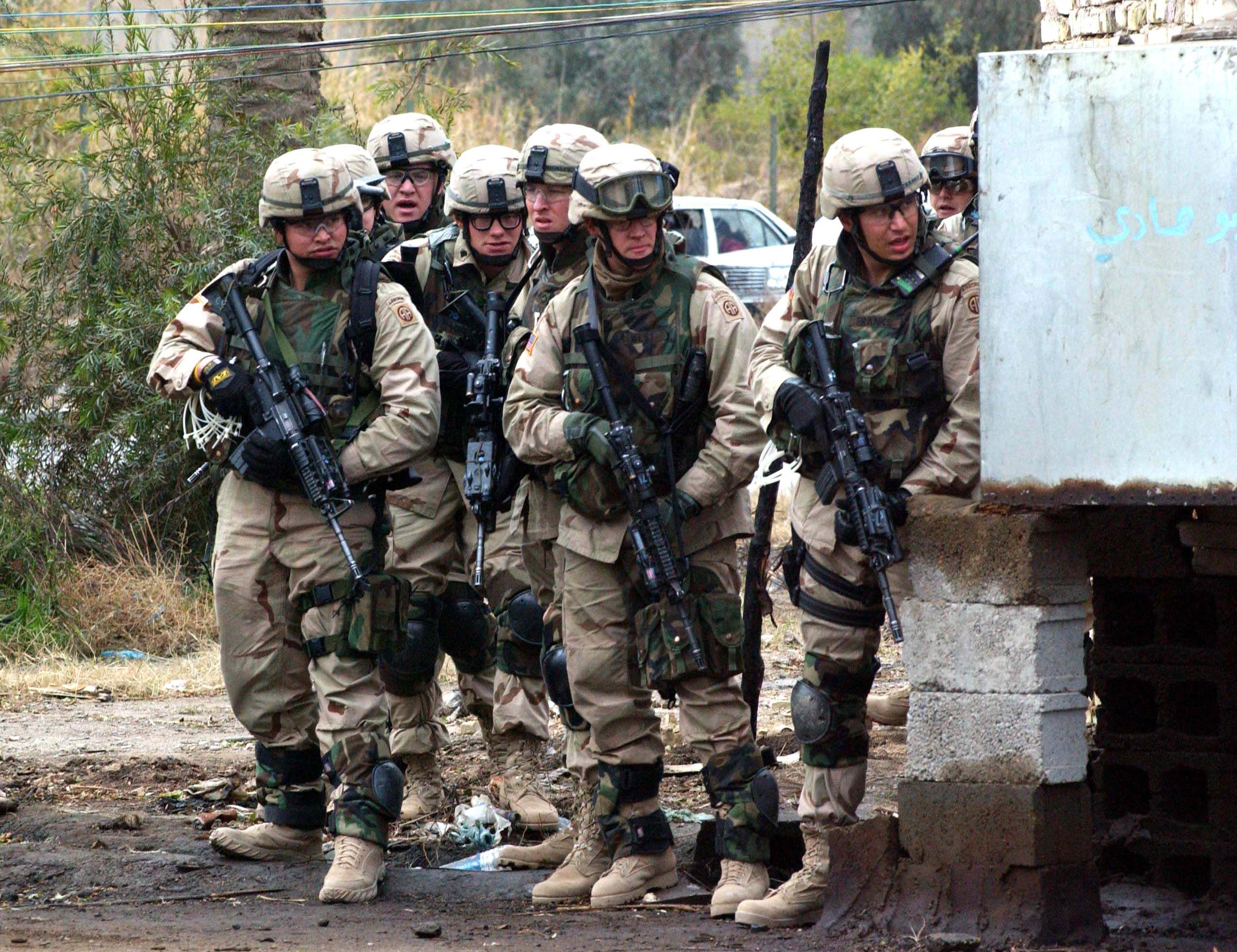
Members of the regiment waiting to dash across a street in Baghdad, Iraq, as part of their mission there searching for suspected militants, 2005

Preparations to invade Iraq, in the face of the threat of Weapons of Mass Destruction, went on from 2002. The Brigade would have a lead role.

On 14 February 2003 the regiment began to deploy to Kuwait as part of Operation Enduring Freedom.

On 28 March 2003, the regiment was called on to spearhead the 82nd's assault into Iraq in support of the Iraq War. During the initial invasion, the regiment was ordered to attack into the town of Samawah to seize four critical bridges over the Euphrates River. For its actions, the regiment was awarded the Presidential Unit Citation.

In April 2003, according to Human Rights Watch, soldiers from the regiment fired indiscriminately into a crowd of Iraqi civilians protesting their presence in the city of Fallujah, killing and wounding many protesters. The battalion suffered no casualties.

The regiment also fought at Al Diwaniyah, Ramadi, Habbaniyah and Baghdad. After the Iraqi Army capitulated in May 2003, the 325th AIR remained in Baghdad to conduct combat and support and stability operations. Missions continued until February 2004, when, after almost a year of sustained combat operations, the regiment returned home to Fort Bragg.

In December 2004, the 1st, 2nd, and 3rd Battalions of the 325th deployed to Iraq to provide security for the country's first-ever free national elections.

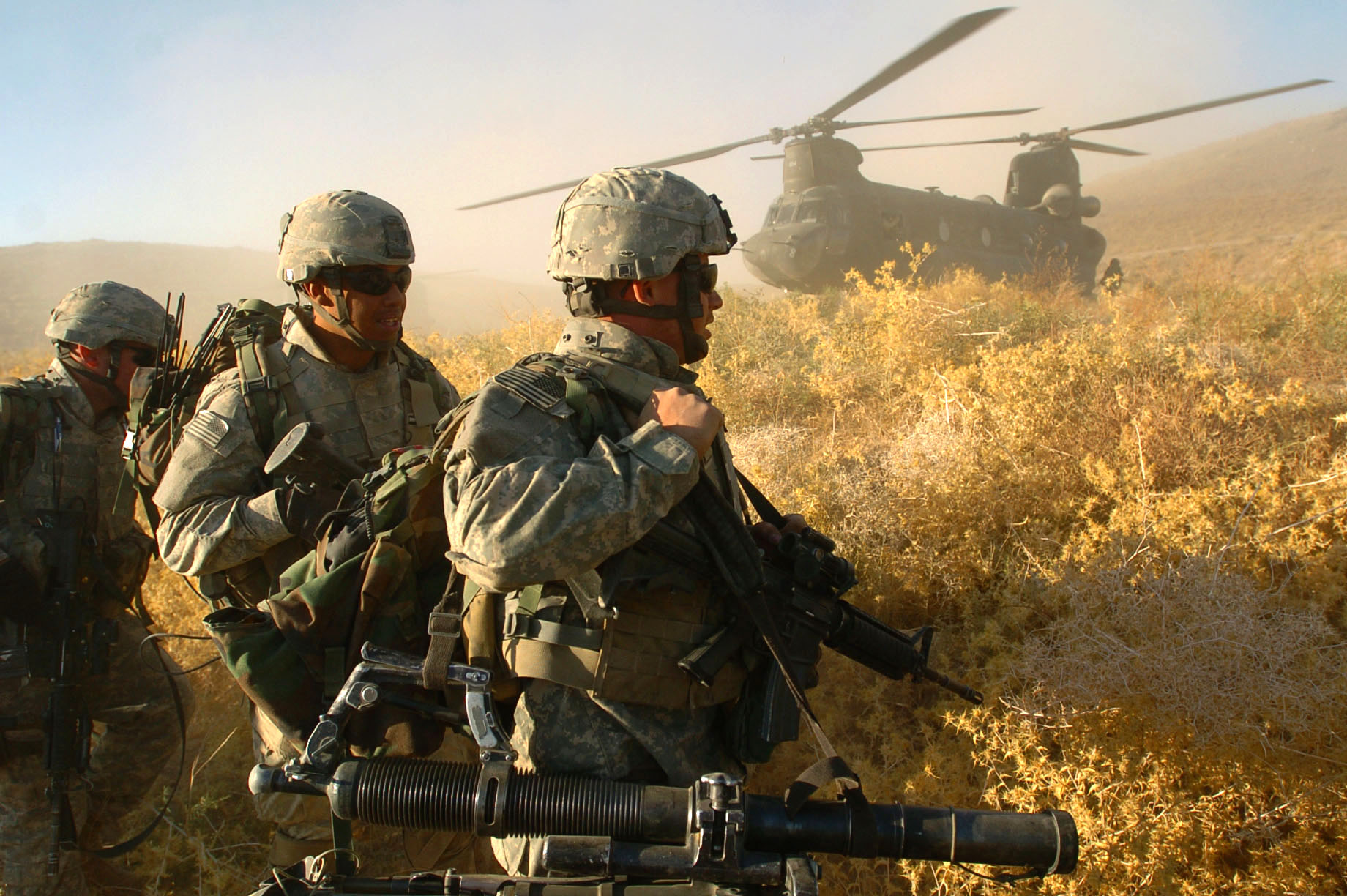
Members of the 1st Battalion, prepare to board a Chinook transport helicopter that will return them to their home base at the end of a five-day mission in Mianashin, Afghanistan, 2005

In July 2005, the 1st Battalion deployed to Afghanistan in support of the Afghanistan national parliamentary elections.

In September 2005, 1st Battalion soldiers were recalled while home on leave from their previous deployment. Six months after the end of their last deployment to Iraq, the Battalions returned to Iraq once more to provide contingency support in Tal Afar during the Iraqi national elections. Their successes during the five-month deployment were commended by the President.

In January 2006, the 325th AIR underwent one of the largest restructurings in its history. As part of the army-wide transformation program, the regiment was reorganized into a modular structure to become the 2nd Brigade Combat Team. As part of the restructuring, the brigade lost one infantry battalion – the 3/325 – but gained an artillery battalion, a mounted reconnaissance and surveillance squadron, a support battalion, and a special troops battalion containing signal, military intelligence, military police and engineer companies.

A year later, in January 2007, the 325th was tasked with spearheading the surge of U.S. forces into Iraq to restore security to the capital of Baghdad.

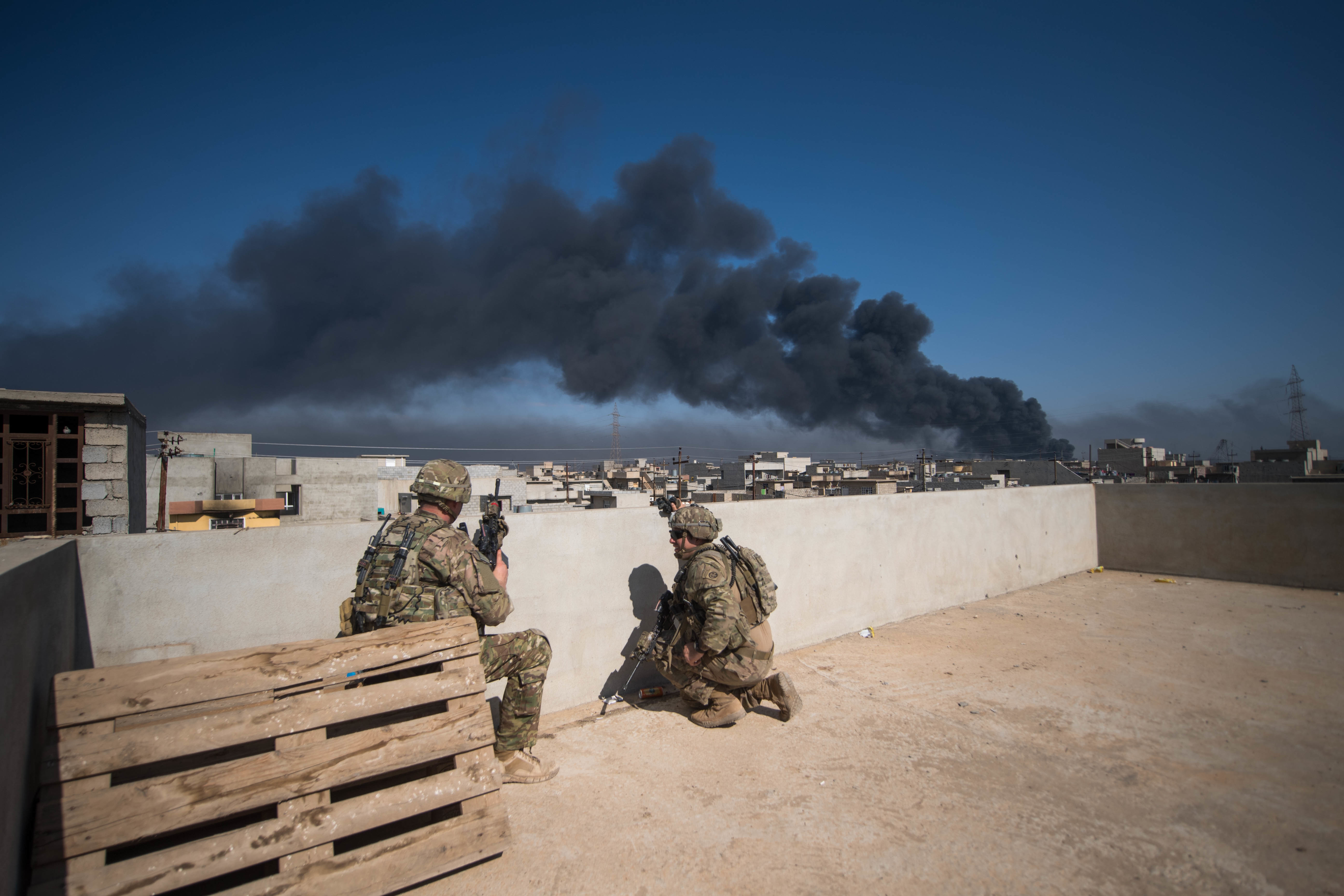
U.S. Army Soldiers, deployed in support of Combined Joint Task Force - Operation Inherent Resolve, assigned to 2nd Battalion, 325th Airborne Infantry Regiment, 2nd Brigade Combat Team, 82nd Airborne Division, use a rooftop as an observation post in Mosul Iraq, 7 March 2017.

With violence in Iraq escalating out of control, the President on 10 January announced a new strategy involving an increase of forces and a new emphasis on counter-insurgency tactics. Within a week of receiving orders, the brigade had 3,000 troops, 300 vehicles, and thousands of pieces of equipment on the way to Iraq.

Over the next 15 months, the 325th moved into small outposts throughout the city and waged an aggressive campaign against Al Qaeda terrorists, Sunni insurgents, Shiite militias, and other elements committed to destroying the fragile Iraqi democracy. At the same time, they devoted thousands of hours of labor and millions of dollars to rebuilding and infrastructure projects. By Christmas of 2007, violence in their area of operations had declined by 95%, and violence throughout all of Iraq was down steeply. The regiment redeployed to Fort Bragg in March 2008.

In May 2011 the 325th deployed to Iraq, over the next 8 months the brigade conducted combat operations and close out of American footholds from Haditha, Ramadi and Baghdad. The brigade suffered the loss of the last American service member in Iraq, SPC. David E. Hickman, on 14 November 2011. By 25 December 2011 the brigade had been returned to Fort Bragg.

In January 2017, Task Force Falcon comprising approximately 1,700 soldiers deployed to Iraq in support of Operation Inherent Resolve. 2nd Brigade Combat Team, 82nd Airborne Division assumed responsibility from Task Force Strike, 2nd Brigade Combat Team, 101st Airborne Division (Air Assault) at Union III in Baghdad.

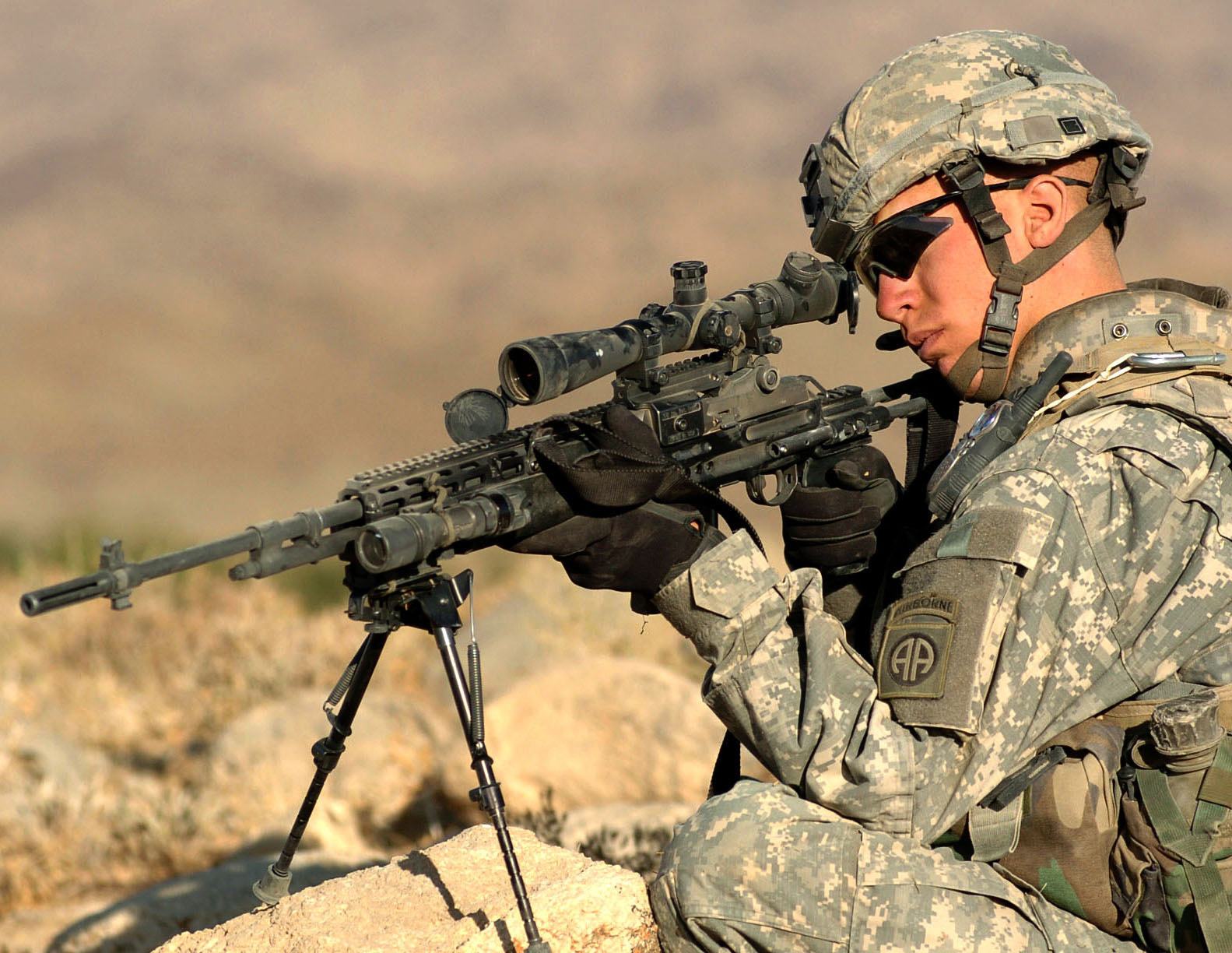
A Designated Marksman armed with an M14 EBR provides security

== Lineage and honors ==
=== Lineage ===
- Constituted 5 August 1917 in the National Army as the 325th Infantry and assigned to the 82d Division
- Organized 1 September 1917 at Camp Gordon, Georgia
- Demobilized 18–25 May 1919 at Camp Upton, New York
- Reconstituted 24 June 1921 in the Organized Reserves as the 325th infantry and assigned to the 82d Division (later redesignated as the 82d Airborne Division)
- Organized in January 1922 with headquarters at Albany, Georgia
- Ordered into active military service 25 March 1942 and reorganized at Camp Claiborne, Louisiana
- Reorganized and redesignated 15 August 1942 as the 325th Glider Infantry

(3d Battalion consolidated 6 April 1945 with the 2d Battalion, 401st Glider Infantry [see ANNEX], and consolidated unit designated 3d Battalion,325th Glider Infantry

- Reorganized and redesignated 15 December 1947 as the 325th Infantry

(Organized Reserves redesignated 25 March 1948 as the Organized Reserve Corps)

- Withdrawn 25 November 1948 from the Organized Reserve Corps and allotted to the Regular Army
- Reorganized and redesignated 15 December 1948 as the 325th Airborne Infantry
- Relieved 1 September 1957 from assignment to the 82d Airborne Division and reorganized as the 325th Infantry, a parent regiment under the Combat Arms Regimental System
- Withdrawn 1 July 1983 from the Combat Arms Regimental System and reorganized under the United States Army Regimental System
- Redesignated 1 October 2005 as the 325th Infantry Regiment

ANNEX

- Constituted 23 July 1918 in the National Army as the 2d Battalion, 401st Infantry, an element of the 101st Division
- Demobilized 30 November 1918
- Reconstituted 24 June 1921 in the Organized Reserves as the 2d Battalion, 401st Infantry, an element of the 101st Division
- Organized in November 1921 in headquarters at Milwaukee, Wisconsin
- Disbanded 15 August 1942; concurrently reconstituted in the Army of the United States as the 2d Battalion, 401st Glider Infantry, an element of the 101st Division, and activated at Camp Claiborne, Louisiana
- Disbanded 1 March 1945 in France
- Reconstituted 6 April 1945 in the Army of the United States as the 2d Battalion, 401st Glider Infantry; concurrently consolidated with the 3d Battalion, 325th Glider Infantry, and consolidated unit designated as the 3d Battalion, 325th Glider Infantry, an element of the 82d Airborne Division

=== Campaign participation credit ===
- World War I: St. Mihiel; Meuse-Argonne; Lorraine 1918
- World War II: Sicily; Naples-Foggia; Normandy (with arrowhead); Rhineland (with arrowhead); Nijmegen; Ardennes-Alsace; Central Europe
- Armed Forces Expeditions: Dominican Republic; Grenada; Panama (with arrowhead)
- Southwest Asia: Defense of Saudi Arabia; Liberation and Defense of Kuwait; Cease-Fire
- Kosovo: Kosovo Defense
- War on Terrorism
  - Afghanistan: Consolidation I
  - Iraq: New Dawn

=== Decorations ===
- Presidential Unit Citation (Army), Streamer embroidered SALERNO
- Presidential Unit Citation (Army), Streamer embroidered STE. MERE EGLISE
- Presidential Unit Citation (Army), Streamer embroidered IRAQ 2003
- Valorous Unit Award, Streamer embroidered IRAQ 2003
- Valorous Unit Award, Streamer embroidered BAGHDAD 2003-2004
- Valorous Unit Award, Streamer embroidered NINEVEH PROVINCE JAN-FEB 2005
- Valorous Unit Award, Streamer embroidered NINEVEH PROVINCE MAY-SEP 2005
- Valorous Unit Award, Streamer embroidered YUSIFIYAH, IRAQ 2006
- Valorous Unit Award, Streamer embroidered BAGHDAD 2007-2008
- Meritorious Unit Commendation (Army) for SOUTHWEST ASIA 1990-1991
- Meritorious Unit Commendation (Army) for IRAQ 2011
- Meritorious Unit Commendation (Army) for IRAQ 2017
- Army Superior Unit Award for 1987–1988
- Army Superior Unit Award for 1994
- Army Superior Unit Award for 1994–1996
- Army Superior Unit Award, Streamer embroidered 2010
- French Croix de Guerre with Palm, World War II, Streamer embroidered STE. MERE EGLISE
- French Croix de Guerre with Palm, World War II, Streamer embroidered COTENTIN
- French Croix de Guerre, World War II, Fourragere
- Military Order of William (Degree of the Knight of the Fourth Class), Streamer embroidered NIJMEGEN 1944
- Netherlands Orange Lanyard
- Belgian Fourragere 1940
  - Cited in the Order of the Day of the Belgian Army for action in the Ardennes
  - Cited in the Order of the Day of the Belgian Army for action in Belgium and Germany

== Notable former members ==
- PFC Charles N. DeGlopper: Medal of Honor
- PFC Demetrius Newton, civil rights attorney and politician

== Further references ==
- "DeGlopper's Medal of Honor certificate". Archived from the original on 2009-08-08. https://web.archive.org/web/20090808135922/http://geocities.com/glidertroop325/DeGlopperMOHCert.html. Retrieved 2008-04-12. http://www.globalsecurity.org/military/agency/army/3-325air.htm
- Regimental Unit Study No. 4 506 The Forcing of the merderet Causeway at La Fiere, France: An Action of the 325th Glider Infantry. European Theater of Operations. United States Army Center of Military History Historical Manuscripts Collection 8-3.1 BB 4.
