= Larry Jaster =

American baseball player (born 1944)

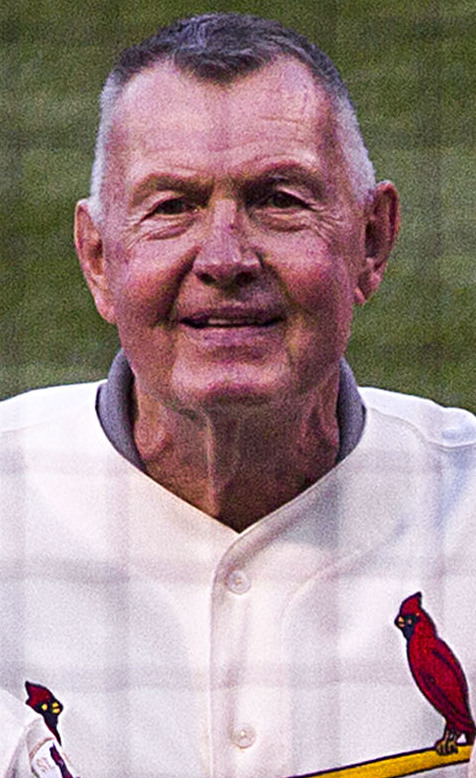
- Jaster in 2017
- Pitcher
- Born: January 13, 1944 (age 82); Midland, Michigan, U.S.
- Batted: Left Threw: Left

MLB debut
- September 17, 1965, for the St. Louis Cardinals

Last MLB appearance
- October 4, 1972, for the Atlanta Braves

MLB statistics
- Win–loss record: 35–33
- Earned run average: 3.65
- Strikeouts: 313
- Stats at Baseball Reference

Teams
- St. Louis Cardinals (1965–1968); Montreal Expos (1969); Atlanta Braves (1970, 1972)

Career highlights and awards
- World Series champion (1967)

Larry Edward Jaster (born January 13, 1944) is an American former professional baseball player and coach. He played in Major League Baseball as a left-handed pitcher between 1965 and 1972 for the St. Louis Cardinals, Montreal Expos and the Atlanta Braves. After his playing career, Jaster served as a major league coach and then as a pitching coordinator for the Braves.

== Career ==
Before Jaster was signed as an undrafted free agent by the St. Louis Cardinals on January 1, 1962, he attended Northwood University. Jaster made his major league debut on September 17, 1965 versus the Los Angeles Dodgers at the age of 21. He finished the year with a record of 3–0 and an ERA of 1.61. All three of Jaster's starts were complete game victories.

Jaster spent most of 1966 in the big leagues where he finished with a record of 11–5 with an ERA of 3.26 which earned him a tie for 4th in the Rookie of the Year balloting for that season. The main highlight of Jaster's 1966 season, were his league leading five shutouts, all of which were against the NL pennant winning Los Angeles Dodgers.

Because of his success against Los Angeles, some people nicknamed Jaster 'The Dodger Killer'. Others gave him the nickname, 'The Creeper'.

Over Jaster's seven-year MLB playing career, he batted .170. Of his twenty-nine career hits, only three were for extra bases, two of which were home runs.

Jaster pitched two more years for St. Louis but never won more than nine games in a season. On May 31, 1968, Jaster pitched no-hit baseball for 7.2 innings against the New York Mets. After retiring the first twenty-three batters he faced, Jaster gave up a single to Greg Goossen.

Larry Jaster made appearances in both the 1967 and 1968 World Series. It was during Game 6 of the 1968 series that he surrendered a grand slam to Jim Northrup. Detroit went on to win the game 13–1, and the series four games to three after being down three games to one.

After the World Series, Jaster was drafted 47th overall by the Montreal Expos in the 1968 MLB expansion draft. He made history on April 14, 1969 by throwing the first pitch in a Major League regular season game in Canada. The Expos defeated Jaster's former team, the Cardinals, 8–7 at Jarry Park that day. Jaster, who gave up seven runs (only two of which were earned) in 3.2 innings of pitching, did not get the decision.

Jaster made six of his eight career errors while playing for Montreal. He finished the 1969 season with a .684 fielding percentage.

After the 1969 season was over, Jaster was sent to the Atlanta Braves in exchange for pitcher Jim Britton and minor league catcher Don Johnson.

Jaster was only twenty-eight years old when he played his last MLB game on October 4, 1972. After that he played two more years of professional baseball with the Richmond Braves.

After his playing days were over, Jaster has worked as a minor league pitching coach or pitching coordinator in the Atlanta Braves and Baltimore Orioles organizations. At present he lives in West Palm Beach, Florida.
