= Jim Britton =

American baseball player (born 1944)

- Pitcher
- Born: March 25, 1944 (age 82); North Tonawanda, New York, U.S.
- Batted: Right Threw: Right

MLB debut
- September 20, 1967, for the Atlanta Braves

Last MLB appearance
- September 25, 1971, for the Montreal Expos

MLB statistics
- Win–loss record: 13–16
- Earned run average: 4.02
- Strikeouts: 138
- Stats at Baseball Reference

Teams
- Atlanta Braves (1967–1969); Montreal Expos (1971)

James Allan Britton (born March 25, 1944) is an American former Major League Baseball pitcher who played from 1967 to 1971 with the Atlanta Braves and Montreal Expos. He was 6 ft 5 in (1.96 m) tall and weighed 225 pounds.

== Career ==
Britton was born in North Tonawanda, New York and attended Tonawanda High School. In 1961, Britton refused a football scholarship to Penn State University and signed as an amateur free agent with the Baltimore Orioles. On November 26, 1962, the Braves drafted him in the first-year draft.

On September 20, 1967, at the age of 23, Britton made his major league debut with the Braves. During this game he gave up a three-run home run to Johnny Bench, the first of Bench's career. Perhaps his best season in the major leagues was his second: in 34 games, he had an ERA of 3.10.

On December 2, 1969, Britton was traded with Don Johnson, a minor leaguer, to the Montreal Expos for pitcher Larry Jaster. Expected to be a spot starter the following season, he missed that season due to arm trouble. On September 25, 1971, Britton played his final major league game.

As a batter, Britton hit .127. The highlight of his hitting career was a double he hit in 1969. Defensively, Britton committed two errors in his career for a .952 fielding percentage. During his career, he wore three numbers: 27 in 1967, 42 in 1968 and 1969, and 27 in 1971.

After his baseball career ended, Britton served as a special agent with the FBI.

== Personal life ==
Britton's father suffered a fatal heart attack while watching Britton bat for the Richmond Braves during the ninth inning of a 1967 game in Rochester, New York. Braves manager Lum Harris told Britton only that his father had fainted and sent him out to pitch the bottom of the ninth inning.
