= Michael Corcoran (Medal of Honor) =

- Born: c. 1847
- Died: October 3, 1919 (aged 71–72)
- Burial place: Calvary Cemetery, Cleveland, Ohio
- Military career
- Allegiance: United States
- Branch: United States Army
- Rank: Corporal
- Unit: 8th Cavalry Regiment
- Conflicts: Indian Wars
- Awards: Medal of Honor

Michael Corcoran (c. 1847 – October 3, 1919) was a United States Army corporal with the 8th Cavalry Regiment who received the Medal of Honor during the Indian Wars. Corcoran's award was issued March 3, 1870, for gallantry in action at Agua Fria River, Arizona, on August 25, 1869.

Corcoran died October 3, 1919, and is interred at Calvary Cemetery in Cleveland, Ohio.

== Medal of Honor citation ==
Rank and organization: Corporal, Company E, 8th U.S. Cavalry. Place and date: At Agua Fria River, Ariz., August 25, 1869. Entered service at: ------. Birth: Philadelphia, Pa. Date of issue: March 3, 1870.

Citation:

Gallantry in action.

== See also ==
- List of Medal of Honor recipients
- List of Medal of Honor recipients for the Indian Wars
