= Tonawanda Middle/High School =

Tonawanda High School

Location
- 600 Fletcher Street; Tonawanda, New York 14150; United States; 43°00′36″N 78°53′42″W

Information
- Type: Public
- Established: 1895
- School district: Tonawanda City School District
- Principal: Lyndsey Todaro
- Faculty: 78.1 (FTE basis)
- Grades: 6 to 12
- Enrollment: 889 (2023–24)
- Student to teacher ratio: 11.38
- Campus: Suburban
- Colors: Maroon, Silver and White
- Slogan: Over a Century of Excellence
- Athletics conference: Section 6 B - North
- Mascot: Timberwolves
- Yearbook: The Tonawandan
- Website: www.tonawandacsd.org/o/tmshs

Tonawanda Middle/High School is a public school located in the Tonawanda, New York, United States. It is part of the Tonawanda City School District.

The school's football field was at one time the home of the Tonawanda Kardex, a professional football team, which achieved fame by playing in just one game as a member of the National Football League in 1921. The Kardex would sometimes draw up to 3,500 fans for a game. However, NFL records list the nonexistent "Lumbermen Stadium" as the team's home field.

In October 2000, the School District announced plans to begin a series of construction projects in early 2001 which would cost $26.4 million (equivalent to $49.4 million in 2025). Pursuant to this plan, Tonawanda's middle and high schools were to occupy separate wings of the same building, now known as Tonawanda Middle/High School.

== Notable alumni ==
- 1941: Charles DeGlopper, recipient of the Congressional Medal of Honor for his actions in World War II
- 1962: Jim Britton, Major League Baseball pitcher
- 1963: Rick Cassata, CFL quarterback
- 1973: Dave Geisel, Major League Baseball pitcher
- 1977: Glen Cook, Major League Baseball pitcher
