= Phillip Louis (Phil) Perew =

Canadian investor and entrepreneur

- Born: Philippe Louis Proulx; 1862; Trois-Rivières, Quebec, Canada
- Died: 1946 (aged 83–84); Tonawanda (city), New York
- Other names: Phil Perew
- Occupations: Inventor, entrepreneur, and showman
- Known for: Inventions and shows

Phillip Louis (Phil) Perew (1862–1946) was a Canadian-American inventor, entrepreneur, and showman of Tonawanda, New York. He patented an eclectic mix of inventions included a towing system for canal-boats, a cigar cutter and lighter, an advertising device (mechanical man), a dish-washing machine and mechanical toys.

== Early life ==
He was born Philippe Louis Proulx at Trois-Rivières in Quebec, Canada East in 1862 to father, Louis Proulx aka Perew (1834–1913) and mother, Léocadie Gauthier.

After his mother's death, he emigrated to the United States when he was about 17 years old in 1879 with his father and his many brothers and sisters. His father was a lake boat captain and settled his family in the Goose Island section of Tonawanda. Phil followed his father onto the Great Lakes as a lake boat captain. A lake boat captain could only work his trade about six months of the year since foul weather and the freezing of the lakes prevented lake commerce during late fall, winter, and early spring.

During the off season Phil busied himself inventing, running hotels, and promoting sporting events. He became a major owner and landlord of much of the real estate in Goose Island section of Tonawanda. Phil married but had no children.

== Inventions ==
Mechanical Man

Phil Perew inventions were quite eclectic including a Roundabout (Merrygoround), a towing system for canal-boats, a cigar cutter and lighter, an advertising device (mechanical man), a butter blender, a dish-washing machine, a hydroaeroplane, a mechanical toy, and a roller screen for windows. Phil's inventions involved mechanical mechanisms and in some cases the application of electrical motive force.

== Showmanship ==
"Mr. Perew headed the Holy Land Entertainment company and was the originator of a spectacle that pictured the life of Christ. The production was shown at many places in New York and other states, travelling up and down the land on a specially made boat.

Mr. Perew is also well remembered by yachtsmen in the Tonawandas and other parts of the Niagara Frontier. He was a racing enthusiast of sailing boats. The owner of the Faug-A-Balah, he raced the boat on the Niagara river in numerous matches with Buffalo and locally-owned yachts in the days when such sport was at its peak in this locality."

"At one time in the early twenties Phil ran concert halls, where the customers sat around sipping drinks at tables, and the artists performed on a raised stage. The concert halls roused much resentment among the church-minded folks of the Tonawandas. Moves were made to quash them but they came to nothing."
