= Frank J. Petrarca =

United States Army Medal of Honor recipient

Frank Joseph Petrarca
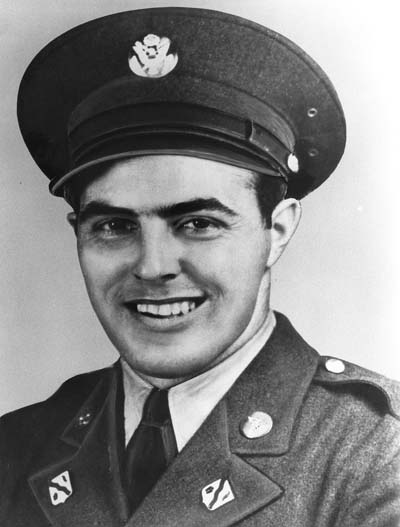
- Private First Class Frank Petrarca
- Born: July 31, 1918; Cleveland, Ohio
- Died: July 31, 1943 (aged 25); New Georgia, Solomon Islands
- Burial place: Calvary Cemetery, Cleveland, Ohio
- Military career
- Allegiance: United States of America
- Branch: United States Army
- Service years: 1940–1943
- Rank: Private First Class
- Units: 145th Infantry Regiment, 37th Infantry Division
- Conflicts: World War II
- Awards: Medal of Honor; Purple Heart

Frank Joseph Petrarca (July 31, 1918 – July 31, 1943) was a United States Army soldier and a recipient of the United States military's highest decoration—the Medal of Honor—for his actions in World War II.

== Biography ==
Petrarca joined the Army from his birth city of Cleveland, Ohio in October 1940, and by July 27, 1943, was serving as a private first class in the Medical Detachment of the 145th Infantry Regiment, 37th Infantry Division. On that day, during the Battle of Munda Point, at Horseshoe Hill on New Georgia in the Solomon Islands, he provided aid to three wounded soldiers despite intense enemy fire. Two days later, on July 29, he helped another wounded soldier who had been partially buried during a mortar barrage. On July 31, he again braved intense hostile fire to aid a wounded comrade, but was killed before he could reach the soldier. He was posthumously awarded the Medal of Honor five months later, on December 23, 1943.

Petrarca, killed on his 25th birthday, was buried at Calvary Cemetery in his hometown of Cleveland, Ohio.

== Medal of Honor citation ==
Private First Class Petrarca's official Medal of Honor citation reads:

For conspicuous gallantry and intrepidity in action above and beyond the call of duty. Pfc. Petrarca advanced with the leading troop element to within 100 yards of the enemy fortifications where mortar and small-arms fire caused a number of casualties. Singling out the most seriously wounded, he worked his way to the aid of Pfc. Scott, lying within 75 yards of the enemy, whose wounds were so serious that he could not even be moved out of the direct line of fire. Pfc Petrarca fearlessly administered first aid to Pfc. Scott and 2 other soldiers and shielded the former until his death. On 29 July 1943, Pfc. Petrarca. during an intense mortar barrage, went to the aid of his sergeant who had been partly buried in a foxhole under the debris of a shell explosion, dug him out, restored him to consciousness and caused his evacuation. On 31 July 1943 and against the warning of a fellow soldier, he went to the aid of a mortar fragment casualty where his path over the crest of a hill exposed him to enemy observation from only 20 yards distance. A target for intense knee mortar and automatic fire, he resolutely worked his way to within 2 yards of his objective where he was mortally wounded by hostile mortar fire. Even on the threshold of death he continued to display valor and contempt for the foe, raising himself to his knees, this intrepid soldier shouted defiance at the enemy, made a last attempt to reach his wounded comrade and fell in glorious death.

== Awards and decorations ==

Badge	Combat Medical Badge		
1st row	Medal of Honor		Bronze Star Medal Retroactively Awarded, 1947
2nd row	Purple Heart	Army Good Conduct Medal	American Defense Service Medal
3rd row	American Campaign Medal	Asiatic-Pacific Campaign Medal with 1 Campaign star	World War II Victory Medal

== Posthumous honors ==
The U.S. Army ship USAT Private Frank J. Petrarca which served in the Pacific Ocean at the end of World War II was named in his honor.

One of the small arms ranges at Ohio National Guard Training Site, Camp Perry, Ohio, is named in honor of Pvt. Petrarca. Camp Perry is the home of the National Rifle and Pistol Championships.

== See also ==
- List of Medal of Honor recipients
- List of Medal of Honor recipients for World War II
