= United States Post Office (Tonawanda, New York) =

- US Post Office-Tonawanda
- U.S. National Register of Historic Places
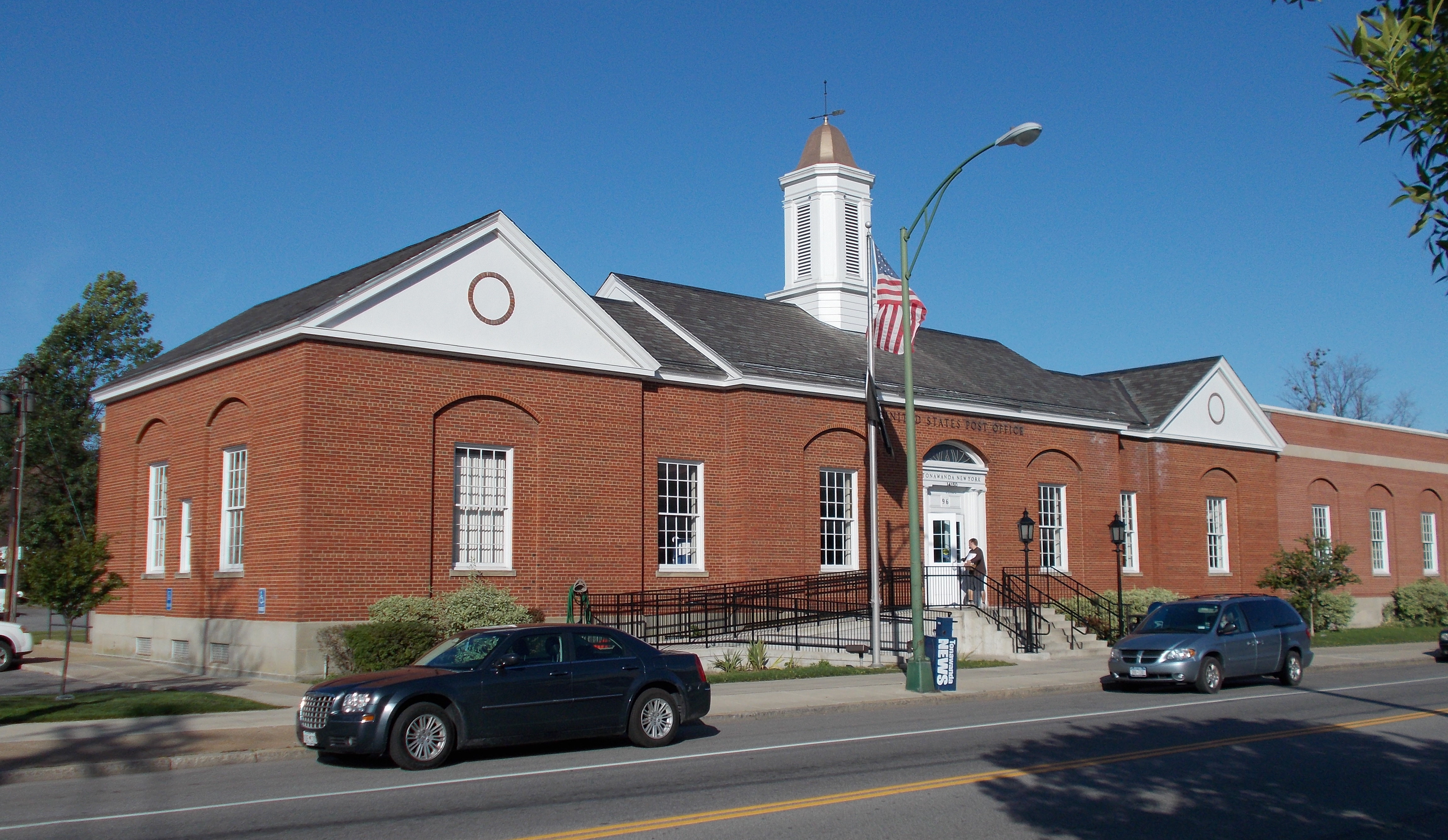
- Tonawanda Post Office, September 2012

- Location within New York Location within the United States
- Map showing the location of Tonawanda Post Office
- Location: 96 Seymour St., Tonawanda, New York
- Coordinates: 43°1′1″N 78°52′47″W
- Built: 1939
- Architect: Louis A. Simon; US Treasury Department
- Architectural style: Colonial Revival
- MPS: US Post Offices in New York State, 1858-1943, TR
- NRHP reference No.: 88002437
- Added to NRHP: May 11, 1989

US Post Office-Tonawanda is a historic post office building located at Tonawanda in Erie County, New York, United States. It was designed and built 1939–1940, and is one of a number of post offices in New York State designed by the Office of the Supervising Architect of the Treasury Department under Louis A. Simon. The building is in the Colonial Revival style and features a central pavilion crowned by a cupola and flanked by end pavilions with gable roofs. The interior once featured a mural by Symeon Shimin, but it was removed and has disappeared. An addition to the north was added in 1964.

It was listed on the National Register of Historic Places in 1989.
