= Mission Hackensack =

Mission Hackensack was one of several follow up landing and supply operations flown during the D-Day invasion (June 6, 1944–August 1944) during World War II. It was the final glider assault of Operation Neptune into France that delivered the 325th Glider Infantry Regiment (GIR) to the 82nd Airborne Division shortly after daybreak on June 7.

== Preparation ==
The units in charge of the Landing Series 37 were the 439th Group out of Upottery Airfield and the 441st Troup Carrier Group out of Merryfield Airfield. The lead serial was scheduled to take off at 0630 from Upottery Airfield in East Devon, England and to land at Landing Zone W (LZW) near the town of Sainte Mere-Eglise, France. They were provided by the 439th Troop Carrier Group. Twenty Waco CG-4A gliders and thirty AS.51 Horsa gliders towed by fifty planes carried the 2nd Battalion 325th Glider Infantry Regiment (GIR), most of the 2nd Battalion of the 401st GIR, which was attached to the 325th and acted as its 3rd battalion. The Horsas carried over 800 of the 968 troops supplied, five vehicles, eleven tons of ammunition and ten tons of miscellaneous supplies. The second serial glider was scheduled to take off at 0700 from Royal Navy Air Station Merryfield in Somerset, England. It was also scheduled to land at Landing Zone W (LZW), at 0900. Another fifty planes and fifty Waco gliders were by the 441st Troop Carrier Group. They carried 363 troops, including pilots and co-pilots (mostly service personnel of the 325th and 401st), and eighteen tons of equipment. This included twenty jeeps, nine trailers, six tons of ammunition and twelve 81mm mortars.

== Mission Execution ==
On June 7, 1944 at approximately 0900, the 325th Glider Infantry landed in Drop Zone (DZ) W near Sainte Mere-Eglise in Normandy, France. All of the second Battalion and most of the 325th's 3rd Battalion were dispersed into four separate fields, with releases made from about 600 feet. Although these landings were somewhat scattered, however most made it to the Les Forges area. The first serial glider went under ground fire from the north. Fifteen troops were killed and sixty were wounded by ground fire or ground fire related accidents. The second serial glider was the most successful despite the 401st being the least experienced serial, and had a clean release with few casualties.

== Casualties and Losses ==
Aircrew killed or missing	0
Aircrew wounded	0
Glider pilots lost	0
Waco Casualties	16*
Horsa Casualties	74*

*troops injured or killed during landing
