= Townsend Harbor, Massachusetts =

Village in Massachusetts, United States

Coordinates: 42°39′10″N 71°40′18″W

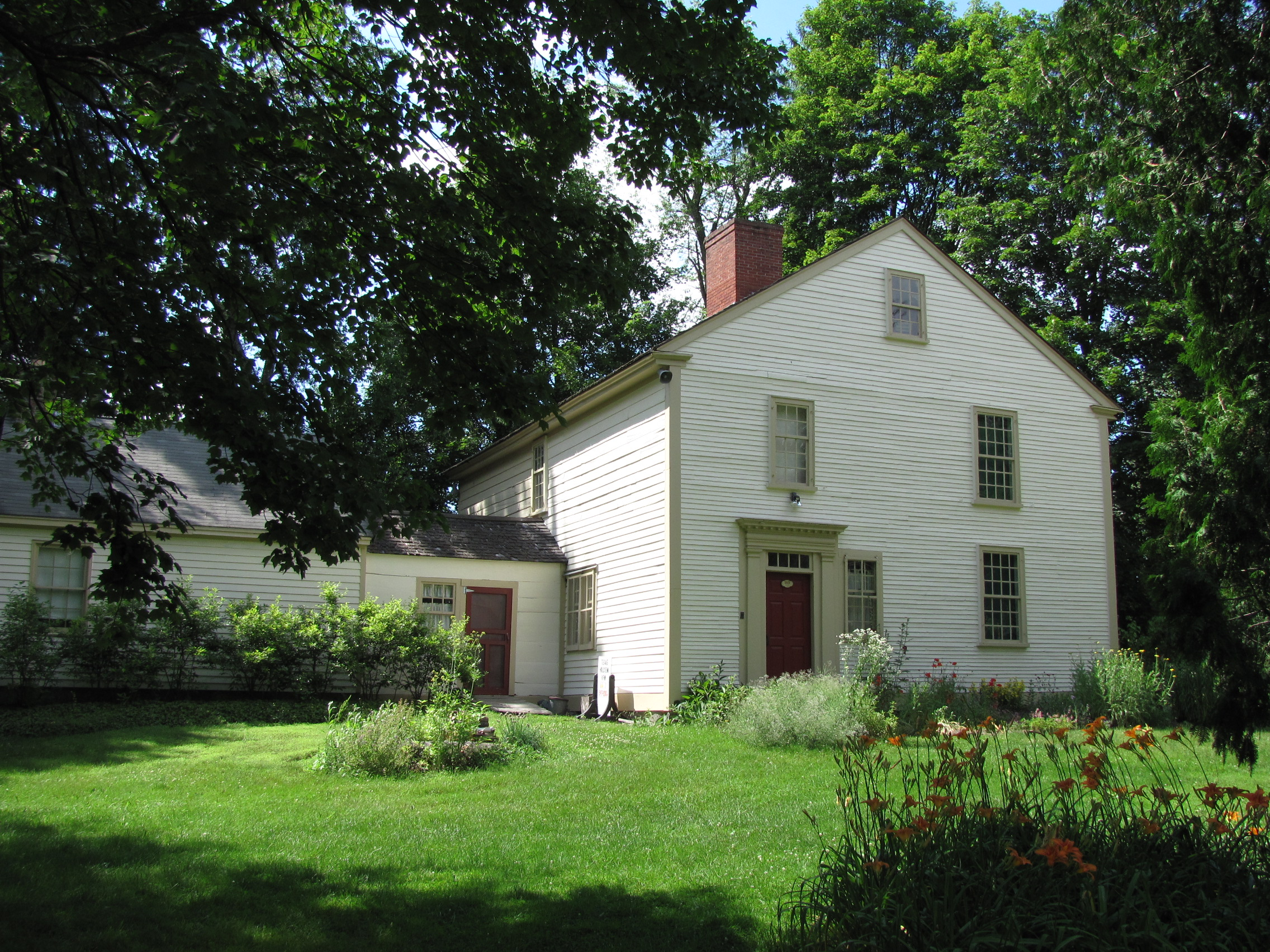
The Reed Homestead

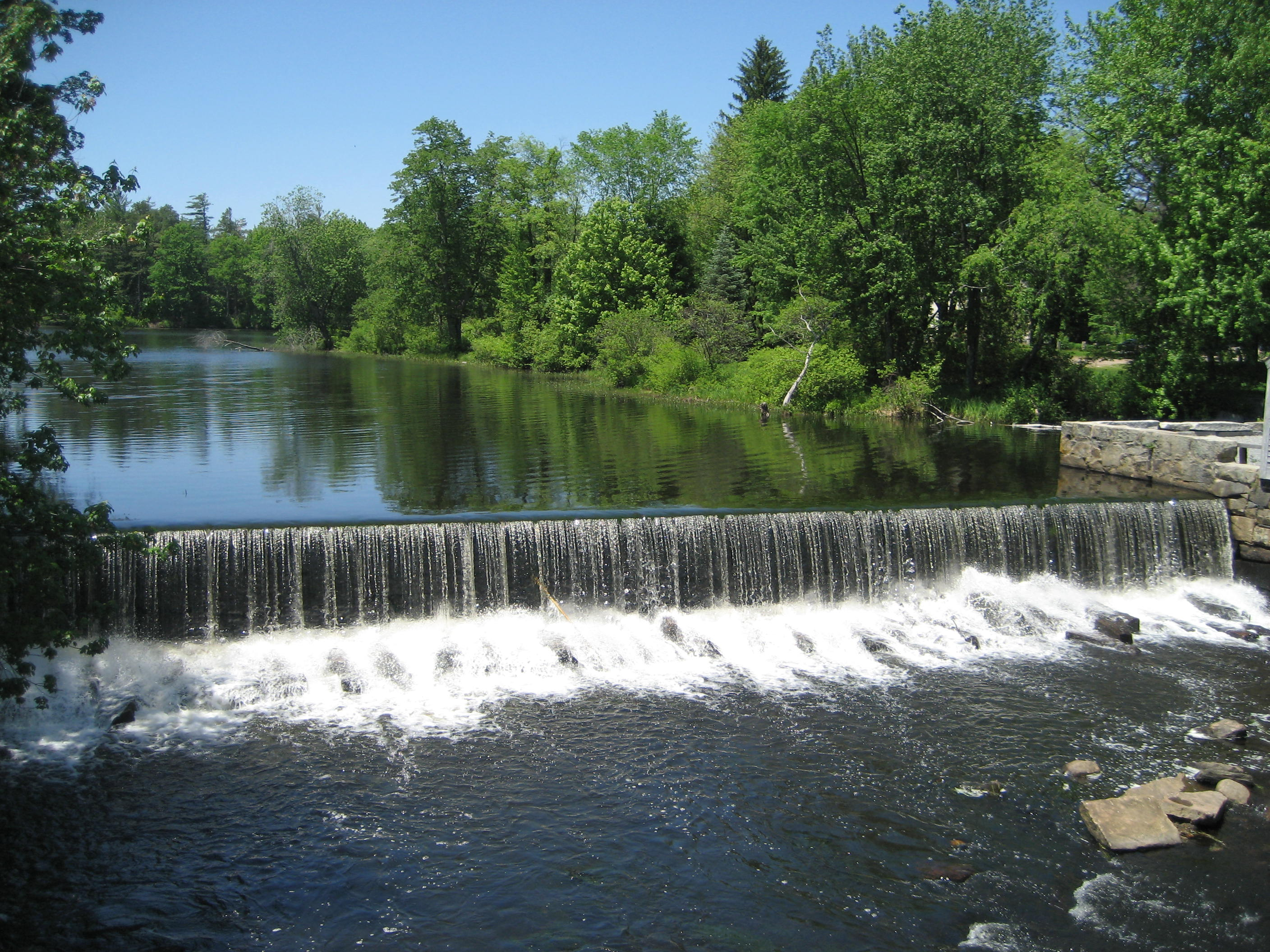
Mill dam on the Squannacook River that forms the Harbor Pond at Townsend Harbor, Massachusetts. Jonas Spaulding ran a Cooperage and Grist Mill at this site before building a Leatherboard Mill there in 1873 that he ran with his brother Waldo. He brought his sons Leon C., Huntley N., and Rolland H. into the leatherboard business by building mills in Milton, New Hampshire, and North Rochester, NH and running them under the name of J Spaulding & Sons Company.

Townsend Harbor is a village in Townsend, Massachusetts, containing Harbor Pond dammed from the Squannacook River. At this location Jonas Spaulding and his brother Waldo started a mill in 1873 that made leatherboard (composed of leather scraps and wood pulp). They did business as Spaulding Brothers. Their family business expanded to locations in New Hampshire and western New York.

Jonas Spaulding expanded further into leatherboard manufacturing, founding a second mill at Milton, New Hampshire, around 1893. This allowed Jonas to bring his three grown sons: Leon C., Huntley N., and Rolland H. Spaulding, into the business in a second company organized as J. Spaulding and Sons. The senior Spaulding started construction of a third leatherboard mill at North Rochester, New Hampshire. It began production in 1900 shortly after his death.

The three Spaulding sons were successful and acquired the Spaulding Brothers mill in Townsend Harbor in 1902, making it part of J. Spaulding and Sons. They later moved their corporate offices to Rochester, New Hampshire. The three brothers continued to expand the business, building a vulcanized fibre mill in Tonawanda, New York in 1911, and a fourth leatherboard mill at a second location in Milton in 1913.

They continued the company as J. Spaulding and Sons until about 1924, when they changed its name to the Spaulding Fibre Company to reflect its product. The corporate offices were moved to Tonawanda, New York, as that plant became the biggest operation. It reached its peak of production and employment in the 1960s, after having added product lines in Spauldite (a competitor for Bakelite) and a fiberglass tube.

Operation of the leatherboard mill at Townsend Harbor ceased in 1957, after the last two surviving siblings, Huntley Spaulding and his married sister Marion S. Potter, died. The two siblings had previously created a charitable trust that took over the Spaulding Fibre Company after their deaths and sold off all assets within 15 years.

== Points of interest ==
- Reed Homestead
