= North Rochester, New Hampshire =

Unincorporated community in New Hampshire, United States

- Unincorporated community
- 1915 catalog cover for "Spaulding's Fibre Counters Guaranteed", showing a rendering of the North Rochester plant at night.

- Location within New Hampshire Location within the United States
- Coordinates: 43°22′22″N 70°59′07″W
- Country: United States
- State: New Hampshire
- County: Strafford
- City: Rochester
- Elevation: 275 ft (84 m)
- Time zone: UTC-5 (Eastern (EST))
  - Summer (DST): UTC-4 (EDT)
- Area code: 603
- GNIS feature ID: 868810

North Rochester is a community in the city of Rochester, New Hampshire, United States, and is the site of the third leatherboard mill built by Jonas Spaulding. Jonas' sons were Leon C., Huntley N. and Rolland H., of whom Huntley N. and Rolland H. would serve as governors of New Hampshire.

== Geography ==
North Rochester is located in the northern corner of the city of Rochester. The Salmon Falls River, which forms the border between New Hampshire and Maine, runs along the eastern edge of the community. The town of Milton, New Hampshire, is directly to the north. New Hampshire Route 125 (Milton Road) runs through the center of North Rochester, leading north 2.5 miles (4.0 km) to the center of Milton and south 5 miles (8 km) to downtown Rochester. The Spaulding Turnpike (New Hampshire Route 16) runs along a hillside on the western edge of the community.

== History ==
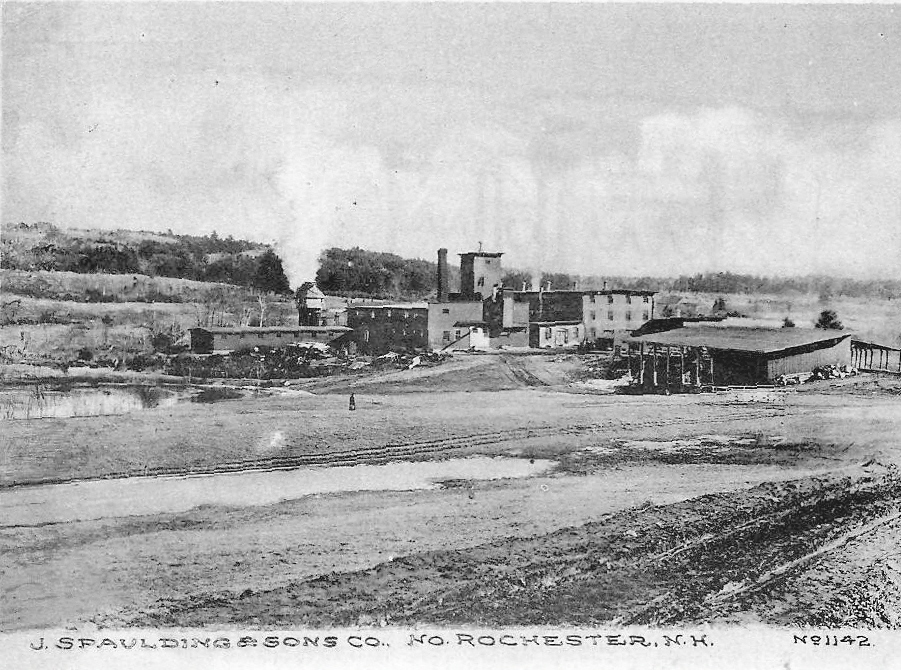
1906 postcard picture of J Spaulding & Sons Company Mill at North Rochester, NH

Once his Milton New Hampshire Leatherboard Mill was running full, Jonas Spaulding explored for another site on which to expand the business. Ira Jones, a hydraulic engineer native to the area, directed Jonas to the old Cottles Woolen Mill site in North Rochester. At the time of Jonas' investigation the rippling water of the Salmon Falls River at the Cottles mill site was a feature on a pleasant day's buggy ride that followed a loop. Ruth Howland reported that the buggy ride would begin in Rochester with a drive up the Milton Road to North Rochester then a cross over the Salmon Falls River was made into Maine. The rippling water at the Cottles Mill site would be viewed on this crossing. The loop would then continue on the Maine side of the Salmon Falls River to East Rochester, there crossing the river to return to Rochester. Jonas decided this would be a good site and started construction on a second leatherboard mill on the Salmon Falls River. The first phase of the project was the construction of a canal with masonry walls. The canal ran 100 feet (30 m) and was 20 feet (6.1 m) wide. The masonry walls were 6 to 10 feet (1.8 to 3.0 m) thick. The next phase of construction was building a solid masonry mass 20 feet (6.1 m) square where the mill wheel was placed (see photo).

Next, a dam was built on the Salmon Falls River that was 160 feet (49 m) long from abutment to abutment. The dam created Spaulding Pond on the river, which extends north for a mile into Milton. The factory building constructed for the mill measured 52 by 200 feet (16 by 61 m) and was four stories high (see postcard photo). Mammoth timbers were used in finishing this solidly constructed mill. When the North Rochester mill started up it, like Milton, would have a Leatherboard capacity of about 7 tons a day.

In 1900, before the North Rochester leatherboard mill was completed, Jonas Spaulding died. Leon C. Spaulding became President of J. Spaulding & Sons Company. With the completion of the mill in North Rochester the Spaulding brothers acquired and started several auxiliary businesses to use and convert the company's leatherboard. In 1900 after the startup of the North Rochester mill, the brothers added to the plant special machinery that was designed to produce shoe counters. In 1898 Spaulding Brothers Company had been assigned US Patent 606,375 for Counter-Cutting Machine from Daniel L. Chandler of Ayer, Massachusetts. In 1902 the brothers acquired Kennebunk Manufacturing Co in Kennebunk, Maine, which company had been making fiberboard lunch boxes since 1898. Later Kennebunk would manufacture violin cases and radio speaker horns. Also in 1902 the Spaulding brothers started a subsidiary, Spaulding Perkins, which manufactured fiberboard receptacles. Spaulding Perkins was the nucleus of Spaulding's material handling division which survives today as Bayhead Products Company. Also in 1902 Leon, Huntley, and Rolland Spaulding (Jonas' sons) brought the Spaulding Brothers (Jonas & Waldo) operations in Townsend Harbor, Massachusetts, under the banner of J. Spaulding & Sons Company. In 1906 the brothers purchased a cutdown machine that could be used to produce products made of multiple plies of fibreboard. It was installed in the North Rochester plant. From this purchase the vulcanized fibre operation in Tonawanda, New York, would develop.

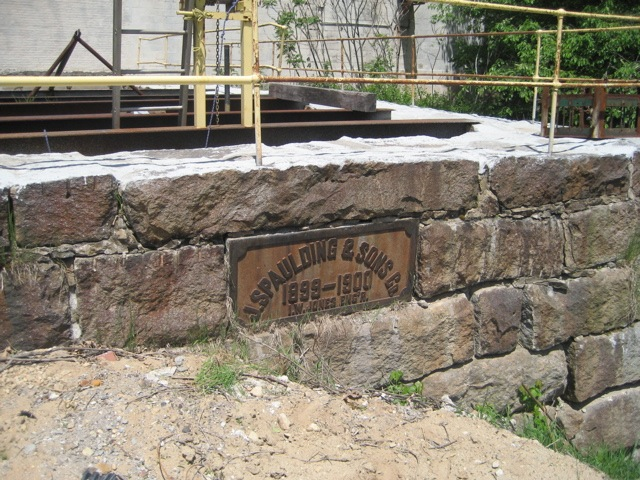
Bronze plaque on masonry that enclosed mill wheel at J Spaulding & Sons Company Mill in North Rochester

The company name changed to Spaulding Fibre Company in 1924. The first of the three Spaulding brothers to die was Leon, in East Sebago, Maine, on September 11, 1924 while overseeing an expansion of the Tonawanda plant that included the addition of a continuous vulcanized fibre-making line. Leon split his time while he personally managed the plant in Tonawanda between the Statler Hotel in Buffalo, New York, and his summer estate in East Sebago. Leon had fallen ill with heart problems five months before his death. On March 14, 1942, Rolland died at the Frisbie Memorial Hospital in Rochester, an institution that benefited from the philanthropy of the Spaulding family.

A disaster befell Spaulding Fibre Company when in 1944 when the North Rochester plant burned. It was rebuilt and reopened in 1946. Huntley N. Spaulding, the last surviving son of Jonas Spaulding, set the cornerstone for the rebuilt mill. When the mill was rebuilt it was designed to make transformer insulation board. At the time of its reopening it was hailed as the most modern fibreboard plant in the world. The plant in North Rochester served as the center for the Spaulding Brothers, and the company's corporate offices remained in Rochester until after Huntley's death on November 11, 1955, after which they were relocated to Tonawanda in 1960. After Huntley's death, Spaulding Fibre Company became part of a charitable trust that Huntley and his only sister Marion S. Potter had set up to disperse their remaining wealth within 15 years of the last to die. Marion S. Potter followed her brother in death on September 27, 1957.

Sons of Jonas Spaulding
