= Skyhaven Airport (New Hampshire) =

Coordinates: 43°17′03″N 070°55′45″W

- IATA: none; ICAO: KDAW; FAA LID: DAW

Summary
- Airport type: Public
- Owner/Operator: Pease Development Authority
- Serves: Rochester, New Hampshire
- Elevation AMSL: 322 ft / 98 m
- Website: www.skyhavennh.com

Map
- Interactive map of Skyhaven Airport

Runways
Direction	Length		Surface
Direction	ft	m	Surface
15/33	4,001	1,220	Asphalt

Statistics (2006)
- Aircraft operations: 17,000
- Based aircraft: 106
- Source: Federal Aviation Administration

Skyhaven Airport (ICAO: KDAW, FAA LID: DAW) is a public-use airport located three miles (5 km) southeast of the central business district of Rochester, a city in Strafford County, New Hampshire, United States. The airport is owned and operated by the Pease Development Authority, with fixed-base operator (FBO) services provided by Skyhaven Aviation Services. It is included in the Federal Aviation Administration (FAA) National Plan of Integrated Airport Systems for 2017–2021, in which it is categorized as a local general aviation facility.

Although most U.S. airports use the same three-letter location identifier for the FAA and IATA, Skyhaven Airport is assigned DAW by the FAA but has no designation from the IATA.

== Facilities and aircraft ==
Skyhaven Airport covers an area of 195 acres (79 ha) and contains one asphalt paved runway designated 15/33 which measures 4,001 x 100 ft (1,220 x 30 m). For the 12-month period ending July 31, 2006, the airport had 17,000 general aviation aircraft operations, an average of 46 per day. At that time there were 106 aircraft based at this airport: 85% single-engine, 3% multi-engine, 1% jet and 11% ultralight.

== See also ==
- List of airports in New Hampshire
