= Groton Leatherboard Company =

- U.S. National Register of Historic Places
- U.S. Historic district
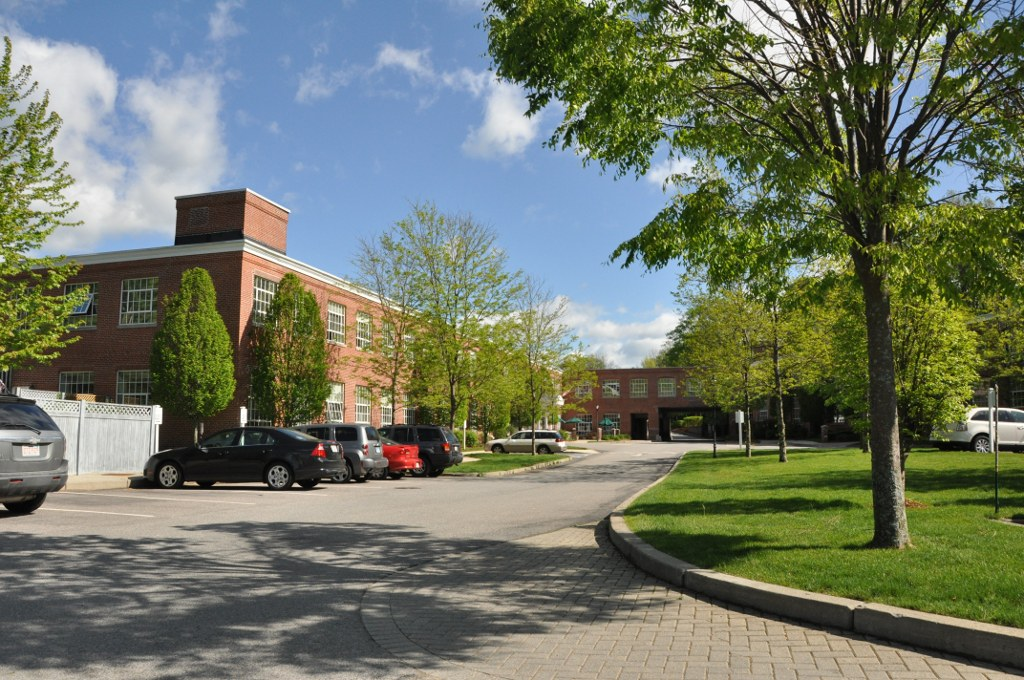

- Location within Massachusetts Location within the United States
- Location: Groton, Massachusetts
- Coordinates: 42°36′8″N 71°37′39″W
- Built: 1916
- Architect: Ira W. Jones
- NRHP reference No.: 02000378
- Added to NRHP: April 18, 2002

The Groton Leatherboard Company is a historic former factory complex at 6 W. Main Street in West Groton, Massachusetts. It manufactured leatherboard, a bonded leather made by pulping and compressing scrap leather, waste paper and wood pulp, but went out of business. The structure has since been renovated and adapted into senior housing called RiverCourt Residences. It was added to the National Register of Historic Places in 2002.

The factory was built in 1916 on the site of an earlier saw and grist mill, which operated by waterpower from the Squannacook River. The original mill was established by the Tarbell family, a name prominent in Groton history since its settlement. The present complex's access road is flanked by brick houses built by brothers of that family; the Col. Abel Tarbell House is today a bed-and-breakfast, while the Asa Tarbell House is a mixed-use annex of the River Court senior housing facility. In 1862, artist Edmund C. Tarbell was born in the latter.

== See also ==
- National Register of Historic Places listings in Middlesex County, Massachusetts
