= Gertrude Jenness Rinden =

American writer

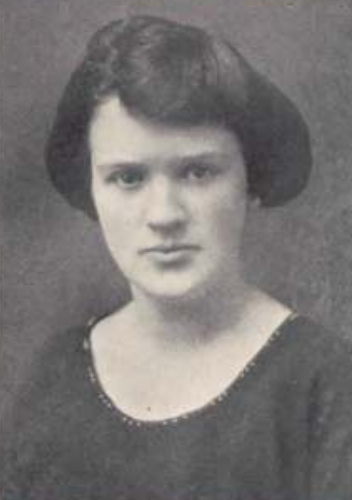
- Gertrude Jenness, from the 1923 yearbook of Mount Holyoke College
- Born: Gertrude M. Jenness; July 4, 1901; Rochester, New Hampshire
- Died: February 29, 1992 (aged 90); Rochester, New Hampshire
- Occupation(s): Missionary, educator, writer
- Known for: Missionary in China from 1926 to 1937, author of children's books

Gertrude Jenness Rinden (July 4, 1901 – February 29, 1992) was an American missionary, educator, and writer.

== Early life ==
Gertrude M. Jenness was born in Rochester, New Hampshire, the daughter of Daniel Fremont Jenness and Ida May Wiggin Jenness. She was a birthright Quaker, a member of the Gonic Meeting. She graduated from Mount Holyoke College in 1923.

== Career ==
Rinden taught at a Quaker school in Maine after college. She served as a missionary at Diongloh and Fuzhou from 1926 to 1937, with her husband, under the auspices of the American Board of Commissioners for Foreign Missions. In 1927 she and her husband fled temporarily to Taiwan during increased violence. She worked mainly with women and children. She and the Rindens' three small children were called back to the United States in 1937, in response to increasing danger from war. In 1938, her husband fled Fuzhou shortly before his house was bombed by Japanese forces. He was in the United States during World War II. While she was in the United States she spoke about China to community groups. They returned to China after World War II, then were evacuated again in 1949; she taught for a year in Kobe, Japan, after that.

Back in the United States, Rinden was a school teacher and elementary school principal at Friends Seminary in New York, and wrote books for young readers. Books by Rinden include The Watch-Goat Boy (1948), The Bible Goes Round the World (1948), Sidewalk Kids (1954), Kenji (1957), and Ten Open Doors (1963). She also wrote teaching materials, including Junior Teacher's Guide on the Changing City (1963), and contributed a chapter, "We Want to Stay Here for Christmas", to an edited collection called Christmas Around the World. Her story "Dragon Boat" was serialized in Jack and Jill in 1957.

== Personal life ==
Gertrude Jenness married Arthur Owen Rinden in 1926. They had three children, Paul, Margaret, and Edith, all born in China. Her son Paul was a lawyer and served in the New Hampshire state legislature. Arthur Rinden tried to divorce her in 1965, but the court refused, with the judge noting, "She lived with her husband through physical danger, hardship, and adversity and showed consistent devotion to Mr. Rinden and his work." They did eventually divorce, and she lived with her widowed sister in Rochester, New Hampshire, in her later years. Gertrude Jenness Rinden died there in 1992, aged 90 years, at a nursing home. Her letters to her friend Sarah Junkin Bray about missionary life in China after World War II are held in the Congregational Library & Archives in Boston.
