= Bradford White =

American manufacturer

- Company type: Employee Owned
- Founded: 1881
- Headquarters: Ambler, Pennsylvania, United States
- Products: Water heaters
- Website: www.bradfordwhite.com

Bradford White Corporation, headquartered in Ambler, Pennsylvania, is an American-owned and employee owned, full-line manufacturer of residential and commercial and industrial products for water heating, space heating, combination heating and storage applications. The corporation's manufacturing facilities are in Middleville, Michigan and Niles, MI, and Rochester, NH. The water heaters were patented by Gerald E. White from the years 1933–1938. The company is among the largest American manufacturers of water heaters, competing with companies such as Rheem and A. O. Smith.

== Products ==
The company manufactures a full-line of natural gas and electric water heaters, including high efficiency heat pump models), and propane models. Their portfolio includes high-efficiency and Energy Star models. The company also offers a line of tankless water heaters.

== Business model ==
Bradford White has a longstanding business model where its water heaters are not sold directly to consumers; Bradford White water heaters are only sold to licensed plumbers at various wholesale supply houses, and are installed in residences only via licensed plumbing services. Bradford White claims this approach ensures proper and safe installation of its water heaters, and also prevents code violations.

In 2006, in a report by J.D. Power and Associates, Bradford White was ranked highest in subcontractor satisfaction of water heater brands.
