= I W Jones Eng'r. =

- Industry: Engineering
- Founded: 1899; 126 years ago
- Founder: Ira W. Jones
- Defunct: 1930
- Headquarters: Milton, New Hampshire, United States
- Areas served: Canada; New England; Southern United States
- Products: Hydroelectric plants, water-powered factories

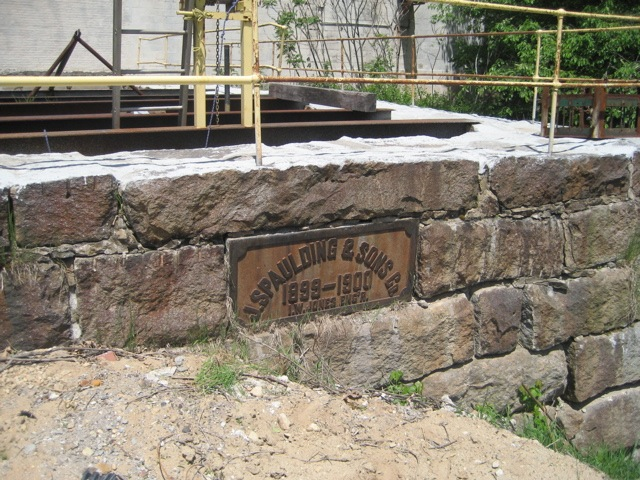
Bronze plaque on masonry that enclosed mill wheel at J Spaulding & Sons Company mill in North Rochester, New Hampshire

I W Jones Eng'r was an American engineering firm that operated from offices on Main Street in Milton, New Hampshire, from 1899 to 1930. The firm built water-powered factories and hydroelectric plants. Ira W. Jones was the principal of the firm.

== Ira W. Jones ==
Ira W. Jones was born in Milton on June 10, 1854. His father was George H. Jones (1826 – after 1910), and his mother was Lucy Jane Varney (1827–1897). Ira had an older sister Addie V. (1848 - ?), an older brother Charles A. (1852 - ?), and a younger sister Nettie J. (1863 - ?). In the 1870 US census, Ira and his brother Charles are shown as working on their father's farm in Milton. However, in the 1880 census, while Charles is still shown as working on the farm, Ira's occupation at 25 years of age is shown as "sets water wheels". In the next available census from 1900, Ira was living in Lebanon, Maine, across the Salmon Falls River from Milton. He had married Lucia C. Wentworth in 1887 and had two children, Nettie age 13 and Mary age 8, at the time of the 1900 census. Ira's occupation was listed as hydraulic engineer in 1900.

Jones's formal education began in the public schools in South Milton, New Hampshire. He graduated from Milton High School and went to Boston, Massachusetts, where he studied drafting at Starr King Drawing School. After completing at Starr King, Jones spent three additional years in Boston making patterns and models. He then spent four years learning the millwright trade before spending a year and a half with a Worcester, Massachusetts, machinery manufacturer as a machinist and draftsman. For the next 13½ years, from about 1887 to 1900, Jones worked selling equipment from machinery manufacturers in Dayton, Ohio, and Worcester. Around 1900, Jones founded an engineering and consulting firm that employed 10 to 15 engineers.

The offices of I.W. Jones Engineers were on Main Street in Milton. The firm specialized in dams, water wheels and turbines, mill buildings and hydroelectric plants and undertook contracts all over New England, the southern states and Canada.

== I W Jones Eng'r. projects ==
Date	Client	Location	Construction contractor	Scope of project
1899–1900	J Spaulding & Sons Co (AKA Spaulding Fibre)	North Rochester, New Hampshire	unknown	dam, run, race, mill wheel/turbine, mill building for leatherboard
1906	Passumpsic Fiber Leather Co.	Passumpsic, Vermont	Stephen and Theodore Chase (owners)	reinforced concrete leatherboard mill, and flumes
1907	Androscoggin Pulp Co.	South Windham, Maine	Aberthaw Construction Company, Boston, Massachusetts	pulp factory
1910–1920	Lockhart Mills	Lockhart Shoals, South Carolina	unknown	hydroelectric power plant
1911–1912	Milton Leatherboard Company	Milton, New Hampshire	Aberthaw Construction Company, Boston, Massachusetts	reinforced concrete dam, run, race, mill wheel/turbine, mill building for leatherboard
1912	Cabot Mfg Co	Topsham, Maine	Aberthaw Construction Company, Boston, Massachusetts	reinforced concrete paper mill, dam, forebays, and flumes
1916	Groton Leatherboard Company	Groton, Massachusetts	unknown	dam, run, race, mill wheel/turbine, mill building for Leatherboard
1916	Swanton, Vermont	Highgate Falls on the Missisquoi River	unknown	dam and hydroelectric power station for Swanton, Vermont
1918	Lockwood Company	Waterville, Maine	plans announced	one-story hydroelectric power plant
1929	South Tamworth Industries	Tamworth, New Hampshire	unknown	Ambursen dam for saw mill

== See also ==
- Economy of New Hampshire
