= Squannacook River Dam =

Coordinates: 42°36′9.2″N 71°37′39.9″W

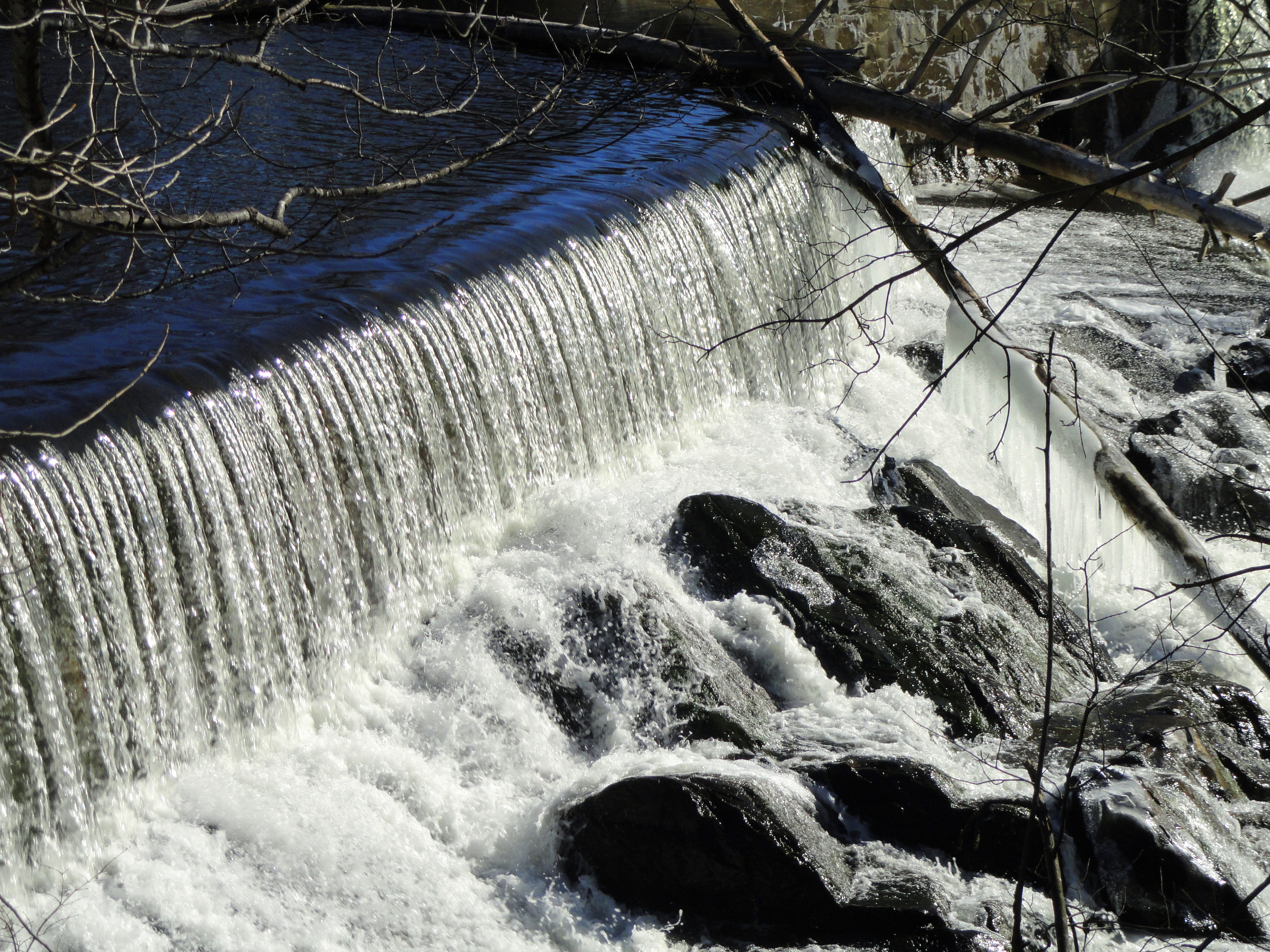
- Interactive map of Squannacook River Dam
- Official name: Squannacook River Dam
- Location: Groton / Shirley, Middlesex County, Massachusetts, USA
- Operator: Massachusetts Power Company

Dam and spillways
- Impounds: Squannacook River
- Height: 30 ft

Reservoir
- Creates: Squannacook River Reservoir

The Squanacook River Dam is a dam south of Groton Road between Groton and Shirley in Middlesex County, Massachusetts, United States. It is one of five dams on the Squannacook River, which forms the boundary between Groton and Shirley.
