= Squannacook River =

River in Massachusetts, United States

Coordinates: 42.581°N 71.609°W

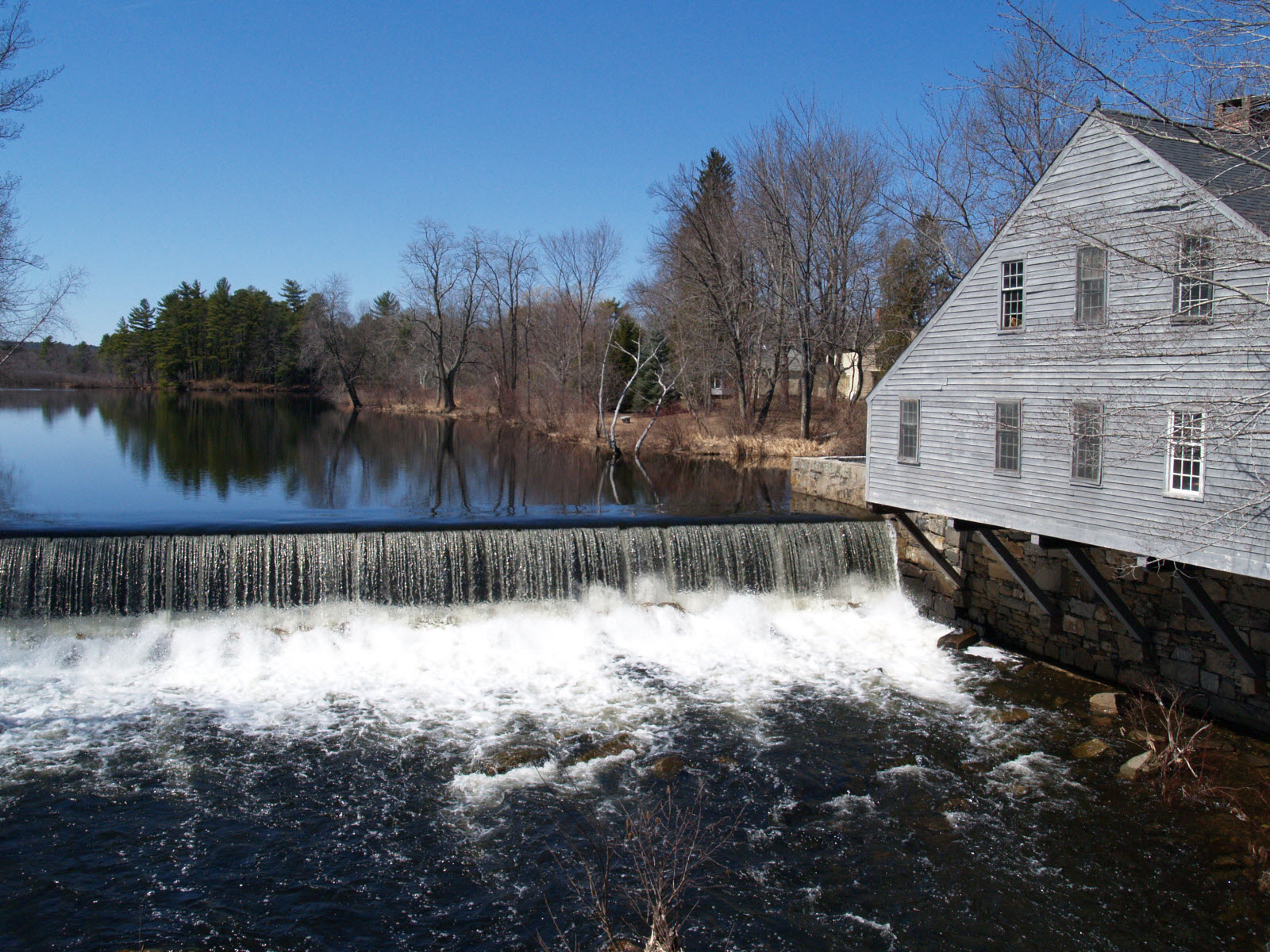
- Squannacook River Townsend Harbor

National Wild and Scenic River
- Type: Scenic
- Designated: March 12, 2019

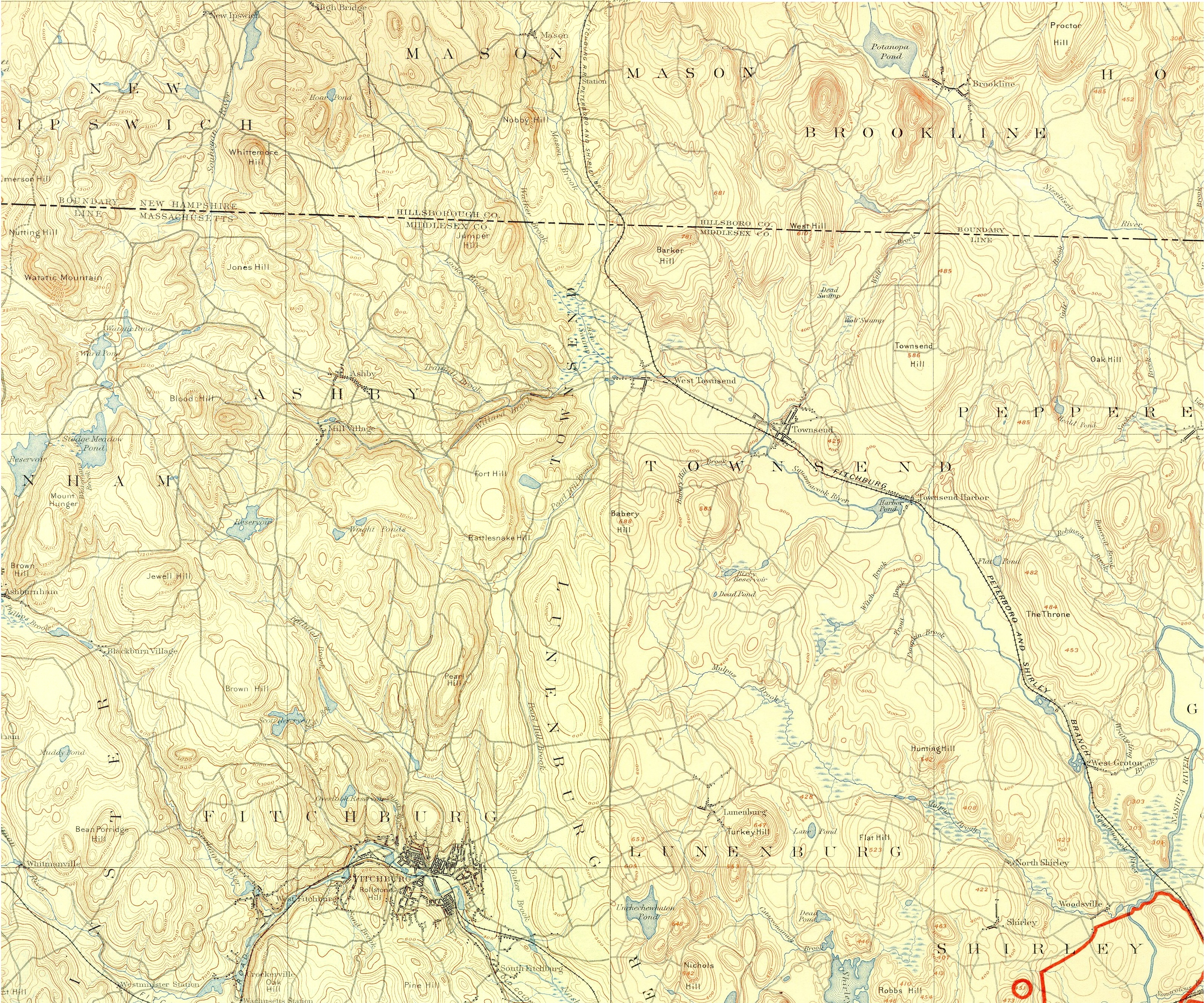
Squannacook River and environs

The Squannacook River is a 16.4-mile-long (26.4 km) river in northern Massachusetts. It is a tributary of the Nashua River and part of the Merrimack River watershed flowing to the Atlantic Ocean.

The river rises within West Townsend, Massachusetts, at the juncture of Walker Brook, Locke Brook, and Willard Brook. Walker and Locke Brooks rise within Greenville, New Ipswich, and Mason, New Hampshire, while Willard Brook rises in Ashby, Massachusetts. The Squannacook flows east and southeast through Townsend and West Groton, Massachusetts, and joins the Nashua River in wetlands just east of Woodsville. The river is dammed three times in Townsend and twice in West Groton. Its watershed covers 73 square miles (190 km^{2}), of which 18% is permanently protected. It has been designated an Outstanding Resource Water.

There has been a conversion of one of the former mills on the Groton portion of the river. The former E.H. Sampson Leather Board Mill became a senior citizen/ nursing home. Riverside is located next to West Groton Square.

== See also ==
- Squannacook River Dam
