= Reed Homestead =

Coordinates: 42.6532°N 71.6735°W

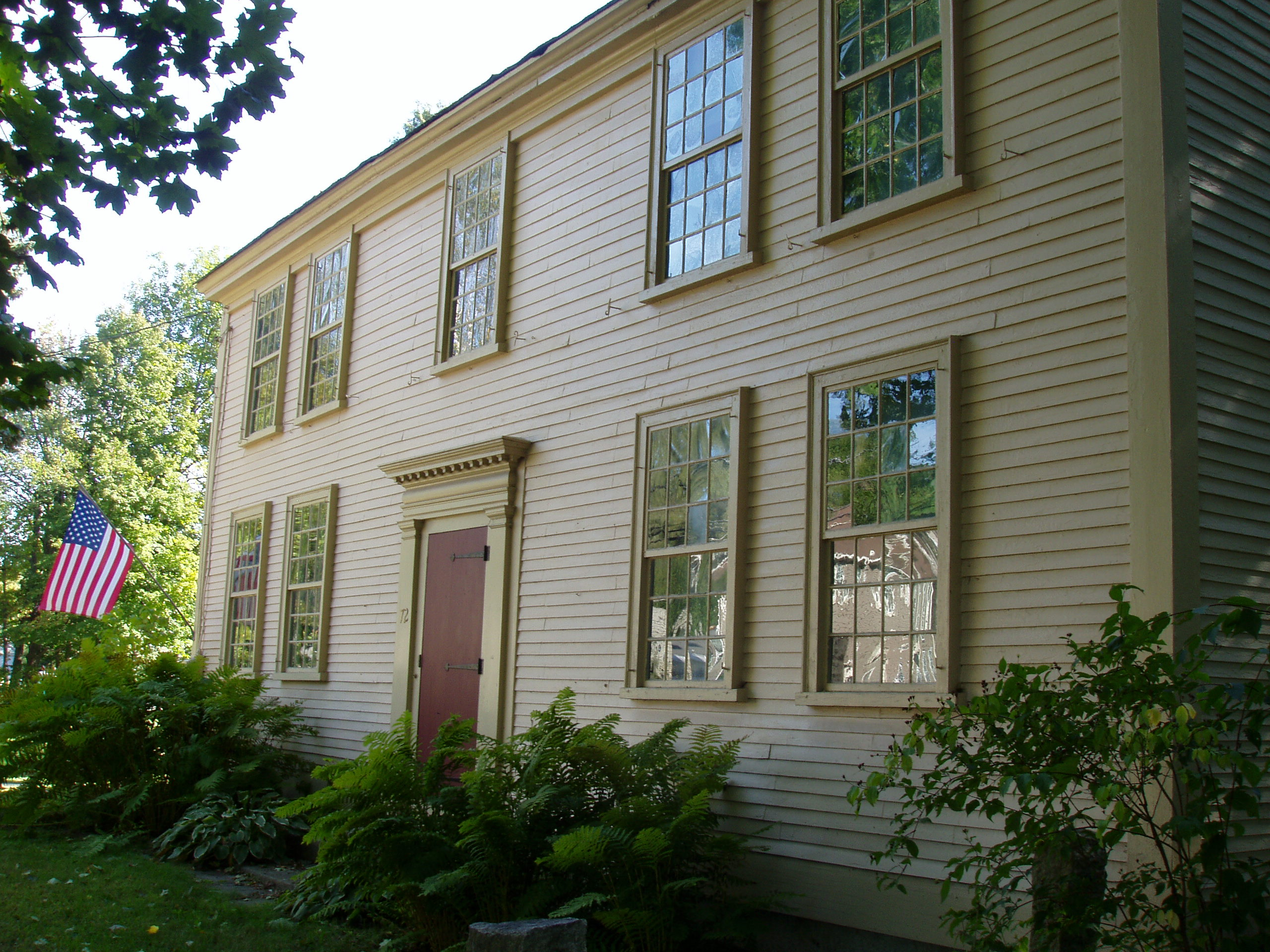
Reed Homestead, with murals attributed to Rufus Porter, founder of Scientific American.

The Reed Homestead (circa 1809) is a historic home currently operated as a historic house museum in Townsend Harbor, Massachusetts.

== Overview ==
The house is notable mainly for its well-preserved murals on the second floor, attributed to Rufus Porter, founder of Scientific American magazine. The murals date from around 1800 to 1835, and are among the best-preserved examples anywhere of Porter's work. Although it is believed that about 160 Porter murals once existed in homes throughout New England, most have subsequently been destroyed by wallpapering or fading due to sunlight.

The two-story, federal-style house was built circa 1809 for Oliver Reed Jr., and inhabited by four generations of the Reed family. In 1973 it was purchased by the Townsend Historical Society. Nearly everything inside is original, from the wide pine floors to the crown glass windows to the mammy bench in the kitchen. Some modernization has taken place (e.g. electricity was installed in the 1920s) but the house retains much of its nineteenth century flavor.

In addition to the murals, the house contains a clothing collection and many original furnishings.

Today, the home is a nonprofit house museum operated by the Townsend Historical Society. It is located at 72 Main Street (Route 119) and open Tuesday through Friday, 9 a.m. to 2 p.m.
