= Rochester, New Hampshire =

City in New Hampshire, United States

- City
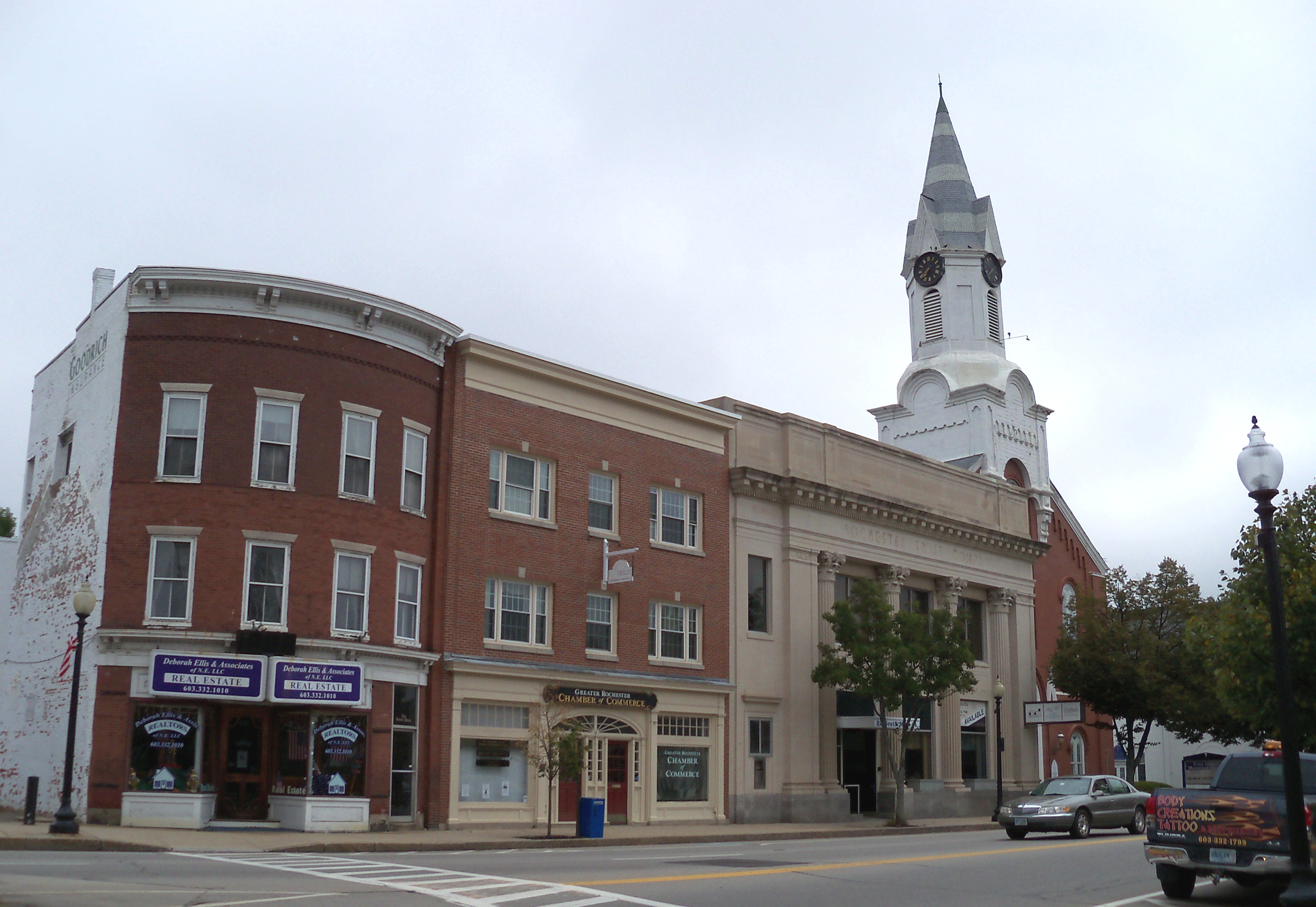
- View of downtown Rochester from Central Square

- Flag Seal
- Nickname: The Lilac City
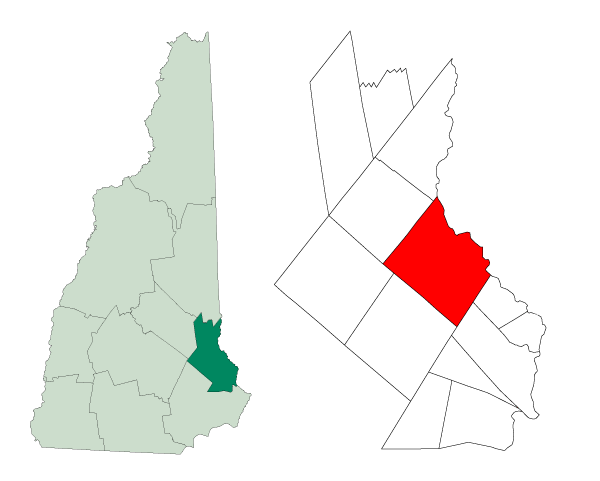
- Location within Strafford County, New Hampshire
- Coordinates: 43°17′52″N 70°58′46″W
- Country: United States
- State: New Hampshire
- County: Strafford
- Settled: 1728; 298 years ago
- Incorporated: 1722; 304 years ago
- Villages: East Rochester; Gonic; North Rochester

Area
  - Total: 45.44 sq mi (117.68 km^{2})
  - Land: 45.02 sq mi (116.60 km^{2})
  - Water: 0.42 sq mi (1.08 km^{2})
- Elevation: 177 ft (54 m)

Population (2020)
  - Total: 32,492
  - Density: 721.7/sq mi (278.65/km^{2})
- Time zone: UTC−5 (EST)
  - Summer (DST): UTC−4 (EDT)
- ZIP codes: 03839, 03866–03868
- Area code: 603
- FIPS code: 33-65140
- GNIS feature ID: 873708
- Website: www.rochesternh.gov

Rochester is a city in Strafford County, New Hampshire, United States. The population was 32,492 at the 2020 census, making it the 6th most populous city in New Hampshire. In addition to the downtown area, the city contains the villages of East Rochester, Gonic, and North Rochester. Skyhaven Airport and part of Baxter Lake are located in Rochester.

Rochester was one of New Hampshire's fastest growing cities between 2010 and 2020.

== History ==
=== Origins ===
The town was one of four granted by colonial governor Samuel Shute of Massachusetts and New Hampshire during his brief term. The other three were Barrington, Nottingham, and Chester. Incorporated in 1722, it was named for his close friend, Laurence Hyde, 1st Earl of Rochester, brother-in-law to King James II. As was customary, tall white pine trees were reserved for use as masts by the Royal Navy.

The same year the town was settled was the first year of Lovewell's War. There were no pitched battles in the town, but throughout the war, there were periodic ambushes of individual settlers. When the provincial assembly put a bounty on Indian scalps, the inhabitants of Rochester organized a militia led by Abraham Benwick to hunt down Indians.

=== Rochester Common ===
In 1737, the Reverend Amos Main became the first settled pastor of the Congregational Church, located on Rochester Hill. The building would be moved to Rochester Common, which then encompassed 250 acres (1.0 km^{2}) and was called "Norway Plain Mille Common" after its abundant Norway pines. At the time, the Common extended into what is now downtown Rochester. By 1738, the farming community contained 60 families. A statue of Parson Main, sculpted by Giuseppe Moretti, today presides over the town square.

By 1780 the area surrounding the Common was the most thickly settled part of town, so a meeting house/church was erected on the east end of the Common with the entrance facing what is now South Main Street. A cemetery was also established near the new meeting house, but the ground was found to be too wet and the bodies were removed to the Old Rochester Cemetery. In 1842, the meeting house/church was moved to the present-day location at the corner of Liberty and South Main Streets. As the years went by, the size of the Common would shrink as more of it was sold off for development. A bandstand was constructed in 1914. Today, the Common is used for community activities such as Memorial Day events and for concerts throughout the summer months, in addition to having a walking track.

During the Revolutionary War, the Common was used as the meeting place for soldiers before going off to war. The common is also the location of the city's Civil War monument that bears the names of the 54 men who died then. The monument was dedicated in the 1870s, and in the 1880s the statue was added to the monument. Four Civil War cannons also decorated the monument, but during World War II, the cannons were melted down for use in the war. They were replaced by World War II guns.

The bandstand was built in 1914 by Miles Dustin; before then, band concerts were held on the square. The flag pole was donated by J. Frank Place in 1917. He was the former publisher of the Rochester Courier.

=== Early education ===
In 1750, Rochester voted at a town meeting to establish a public school to teach writing and reading to the town's children. The vote was quickly overturned, which violated colonial laws mandating schools in each community. In 1752 the first public schooling began. The school lasted for 16 weeks and the schoolmaster was named John Forst. He was paid a salary of 15 pounds and boarded with a different family each month (this family received 30 cents a week from the city).

For many years, the city followed the pattern of the first school by opening one and closing it shortly after. Eventually, the citizens realized that a school was necessary, but funding one was an issue. In 1783, the state demanded that schools were opened permanently or else the state would penalize them. A year later, permanent schools were established. Corporal punishment was commonly used by the schoolmasters.

In 1806, the school system was divided into districts in accordance with state law that was passed in 1805. This system of districts remained in place until 1884 when laws regarding districts changed. The schools in this system often lacked the necessary educational materials. Eventually the number of students attending school across the state diminished. This led to the disestablishment of this system because communities across the state, including Rochester, had many schools with extremely low numbers of students.

In 1850, the city voted to allow high schools and the funding of them. However, money was not actually raised for high schools until 1868. The first high school opened in 1857. The principal and teacher was William A. Kimball. At that time, a school year lasted for 22 weeks. High school attendance was relatively low, and most dropped out before graduating.

=== Growth through the 19th century ===
Mail service was established in 1768 when a post rider traveled from Portsmouth through Berwick, Dover and Rochester bringing gazettes. In 1792, this improved when Joseph Paine would deliver and pick up mail once a week. When he arrived in town, a horn would blow to inform the town of his presence. A regular post office was established on March 26, 1812 in the Barke Tavern. The first postmaster in Rochester was William Barker.

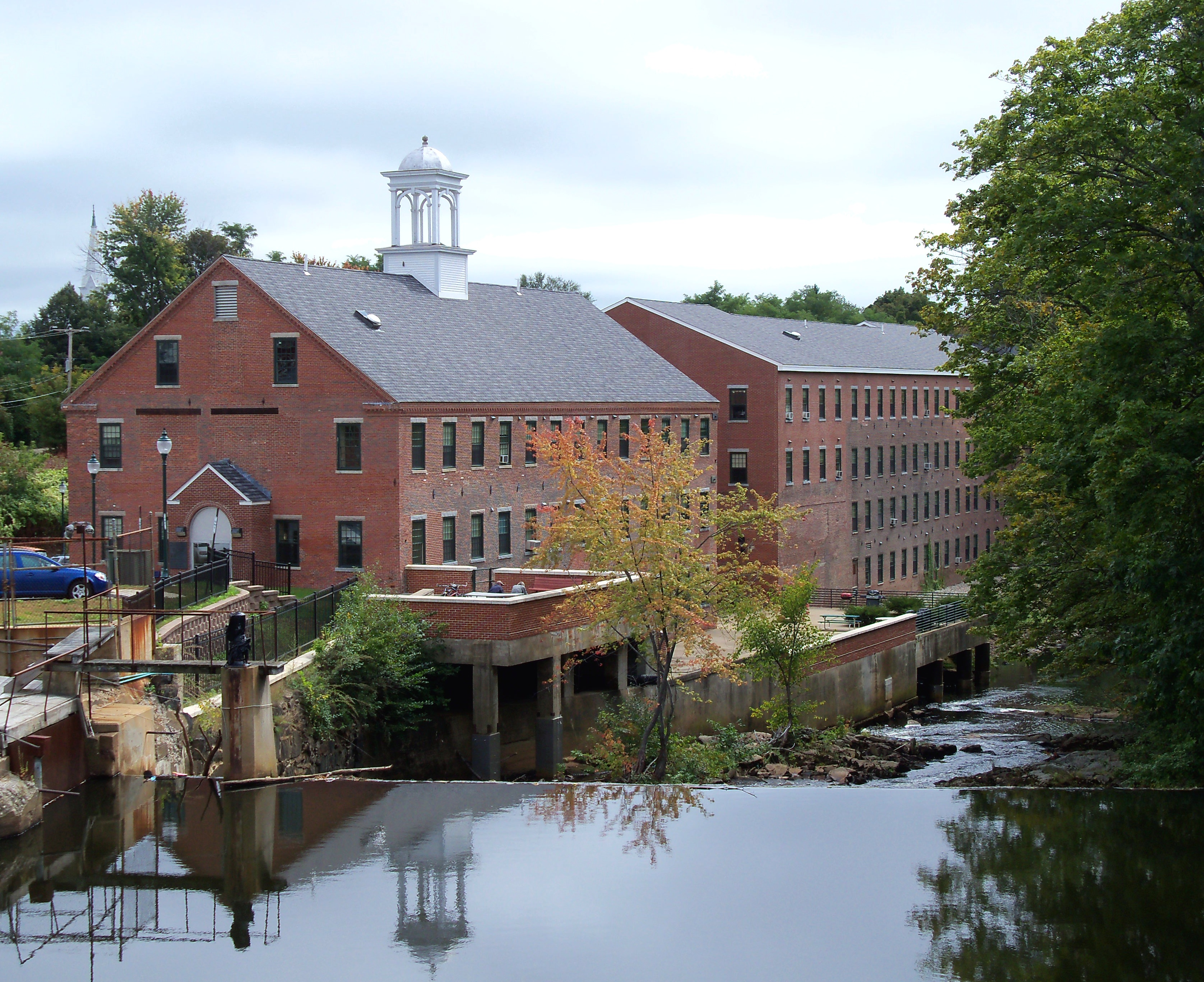
The Cocheco River provided power for the city's early factories and mills.

The first large business was lumbering, although it would be overtaken by other industries as Rochester developed into a mill town with the Cochecho River to provide water power. In 1806, six tanneries were operating, along with a sawmill, fulling mill, and two gristmills. By the 1820s–1830s, the town had a cabinet maker and clockmaker. The Mechanics Company was established in 1834, producing woolen blankets that won the premium quality award at the 1853 New York World's Fair. The Norway Plains Woolen Company manufactured blankets used by the Union Army in the Civil War, and in 1870 wove 1,600,000 yards (1,500,000 m) of textiles, but by the century's end, the company was out of business. Shoe manufacturing had surpassed textiles as Rochester's dominant industry by 1880.

In 1854, the E.G. & E. Wallace Shoe Company was established, eventually becoming the city's largest employer with over 700 workers in 1901. Its name changed to the Rochester Shoe Corporation in the 1920s. The Wallace brothers died in the 1890s, and other shoe factories opened, including Perkins, Linscott & Company (later the Linscott, Tyler, Wilson Company) off Wakefield Street and N. B. Thayer & Company, Inc., in East Rochester. In the early twentieth century, more people were employed in shoe manufacturing than in all other local industries combined. Rochester contributed to New Hampshire's position as the nation's third largest shoe-producing state. The Kessel Fire Brick Company was established in 1889, and at one time bricks for new buildings at Harvard University were made in Gonic. Carrying the freight were four railroads that once passed through Rochester, a major junction between Haverhill, Massachusetts, and Portland, Maine. Agriculture continued to be important, and in 1875 the Rochester Fair was established. In 1891, Rochester was incorporated as a city.

The first telephone was installed in 1885 in the K.C. Sanborn Drug Store. The phone was connected to the Dover Telephone Exchange. By the early 1900s, there were 1,200 local calls and 400 toll calls a day made from Rochester.

In 1889 and 1900, Jonas Spaulding and his three sons Leon, Huntley, and Rolland, built a leatherboard mill at North Rochester. Jonas died before the mill became operational, but his three sons ran it well in co-partnership and expanded the company nationally and internationally. Leon Cummings Spaulding served as the president of the J. Spaulding and Sons Company after his father's death.

During the Great Depression, however, several industries left for cheaper operating conditions in the South or went bankrupt. But the affluent mill era left behind fine architecture, including the Rochester Public Library, a Carnegie Library designed by Concord architects Randlett & Griffin.

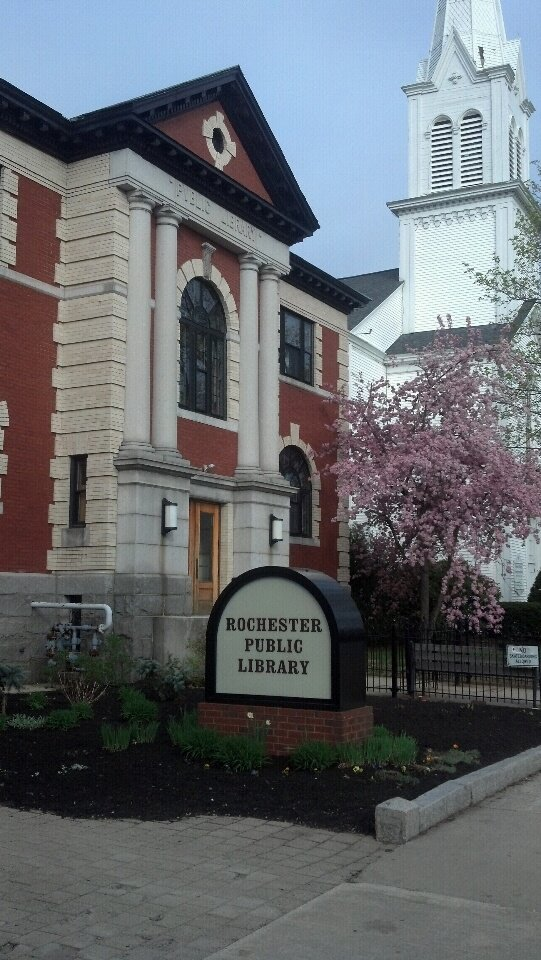
Rochester Public Library

=== Library ===
The Rochester Public Library was approved in 1893 but was not open to the public until early 1894. Back then, the library was located on the corner of Portland Street and South Main Street. In 1897, the library moved to City Hall, where it remained for over eight years.

In the early 1900s, Osman Warren, Rochester's postmaster, contacted Andrew Carnegie for help in securing an endowment to build the new library. The Carnegie Institute donated $20,000 to construct the new building. The new library was built on the site of what was the Main Street School. The library was built in the Georgian revival style, using brick and granite, and the inside was finished with golden oak and cypress. The library opened on October 2, 1905, and 150 people registered the first day. Miss Lillian Parshley was the first librarian, serving until her death in 1945. Velma Foss, Miss Parshley's assistant, was the second librarian of the Rochester Library.

=== City Hall and Opera House ===
Another notable structure is Rochester City Hall, built in 1908, and the Rochester Opera House designed by George G. Adams. Adams designed other municipal government/opera house dual-purpose buildings around New England, including in Bellows Falls, Vermont (1887); Amesbury, Massachusetts (1887); Dover, New Hampshire (1891); and Derry, New Hampshire (1901). Only four of his structures survive today (in Waterville, Maine, Montpelier, Vermont, Derry, and Rochester), with many of his buildings destroyed by fires.

Adams' opera houses were unique because of their floors, which were movable and could function in both inclined or level position. With the floor in the inclined position, the opera house would show plays, concerts, etc. When the floor was level, the building could be used for dances or public meetings. The Rochester Opera House opened on Memorial Day 1908. Almost all of Adams' buildings contained movable floors, though the buildings in Waterville and Montpelier did not. Because of the destruction of the other opera houses, the Rochester Opera House is the only known theatre in the United States to use this type of movable floor.

Rochester City Hall contained the Rochester Police Department in its basement offices for many years. Some historical portraits of officers remain in an upstairs chamber where a collection of portraits of city officials was traditionally preserved, including officers Nelson S. Hatch and Red Hayes.

Today, visitors may still attend shows at the Rochester Opera House. The City of Rochester has preserved the 90-year-old historical décor of the Opera House.

=== 20th century ===
Rochester's thriving shoe industry in the early twentieth century attracted entrepreneurs from out of state. In 1930 Samuel J. Katz of Brookline, Massachusetts, incorporated the Hubbard Shoe Company and commenced operations in N. B. Thayer & Company's factory on Pleasant Street in East Rochester before the end of the year. By 1931 the firm had also taken over the Linscott, Tyler, Wilson factory off Wakefield Street in Rochester, which it purchased outright in May 1932. At its peak, the Hubbard Shoe Company employed about four hundred people in East Rochester making men's shoes and five hundred in Rochester making women's shoes, with a total annual payroll of $3 million and total annual output of 2.5 million shoes. In 1934 the Maybury Shoe Company began operations on the former E.G. & E. Wallace site on South Main Street. Both firms survived the Great Depression, providing steady jobs for hundreds of Rochester citizens, and converted to a wartime footing during World War Two, but were unable to compete against the flood of cheap foreign imports in the 1970s. Hubbard Shoe Company went out of business in 1973, and Maybury Shoe closed in the mid-1970s. Samuel Katz's son Saul, however, went on to found the profitable Rockport Shoe Company with his son, Bruce R. Katz.

Rochester passed out of the silent film era on May 20, 1929, with the arrival of the first talking motion picture in the city, titled The Wild Party, starring Clara Bow. The movie was shown at the Scenic Theater. The evening admission price was 35 cents for adults and 15 cents for children.

A Rochester Courier article from October 1930 described a new indoor golf course:

INDOOR GOLF COURSE TO BE OPENED ON SATURDAY

The Leavitt Theatre Property Transformed Inside Into a Bower of Beauty - Rochester is to have an indoor golf course, which, it is said, will be second to none, in beauty and attractiveness, this side of New York. Fred Couture, proprietor of the Scenic theatre, who a few months since purchased the Leavitt theatre on South Main Street, has been laying out a small fortune in fitting it up on the ground floor for such use. This building was formerly the residence of the Hon. Summer Wallace and was one of the most beautiful mansions in New Hampshire. Despite the way in which the outside was altered to make the theatre, much of the magnificent paneling inside has been preserved. It was a foundation for an unusual setting for indoor golf. A large force of workers has been engaged in recent weeks, working in relays, and this week six scene painters are decorating the walls and ceilings. There are to be an Egyptian room, a Japanese room, an Indian room and a Dutch room. The walls of each are adorned with appropriate paintings to form a picture of any particular land represented. The Dutch room, for example, not only has the paintings of the canals and dikes but an actual windmill revolving. In the Indian room are pictures of forests and streams, with an Indian paddling a canoe. There is a real waterfall too, with the water flowing down over actual rocks into a series of three basins, with a pool for goldfish at the bottom. One room represents the seashore, the entire wall being one huge painting of the ocean, with a real light house perched up on a promontory, with a light shedding forth its rays. There is also a garden room with a profusion of flowers. There are various rest rooms and seats in plenty everywhere for the onlookers or tired players. All the floors will be covered with artificial grass. In a conspicuous place is a great pile of stones, with a fountain at the top, out of which a tiny stream trickles down over the rocks in various small channels and little pools. Ferns grow on its sides. There are also in various places tree trunks, some birch with their white bark and other varieties. There will be eighteen holes to the golf course, with various traps and some mysteries. The whole place is certainly a wonderful representation of the great out-of-doors and a veritable dream of loveliness. The grand opening is set for Saturday evening at 6:00, when Mayor Louis H. McDuffee will press the button and turn on the lights.

=== Natural disasters ===
The summer of 1947 was dry. In late October of that year only 1/8 inch of rain had fallen since mid-September, and the temperatures were high. Small ponds and streams were dried up, and local farmers were using water from the Salmon Falls River and Cocheco River to provide water for their livestock. Fire risk was high. On October 21, sparks from a passing train car in Farmington ignited the dry grass on both sides of the track, starting the biggest fire to strike Rochester.

At first, firefighters seemed to have the fire in control, but two days later, winds up to 60 miles per hour (97 km/h) drove the "small" fire out of control. The wind-driven fire moved to the south and east into Rochester. The fire would engulf an area over 9 miles (14 km) long and over 2 miles (3 km) wide with walls of flame 40 feet (12 m) high. Before the fire was under control, over 30 homes in Rochester would be lost.

Hurricane Carol struck New Hampshire on September 2, 1954. The winds of the hurricane were in excess of 90 miles per hour (140 km/h). The property damage in New Hampshire was estimated to be 3 million dollars, and 4 inches (100 mm) of rain fell during the storm.

A Category 5 hurricane, known locally as the Hurricane of '38, was the most deadly of New Hampshire's history, causing excessive damage to Rochester and outlying communities. Hurricane Carol was a Category 3 storm.

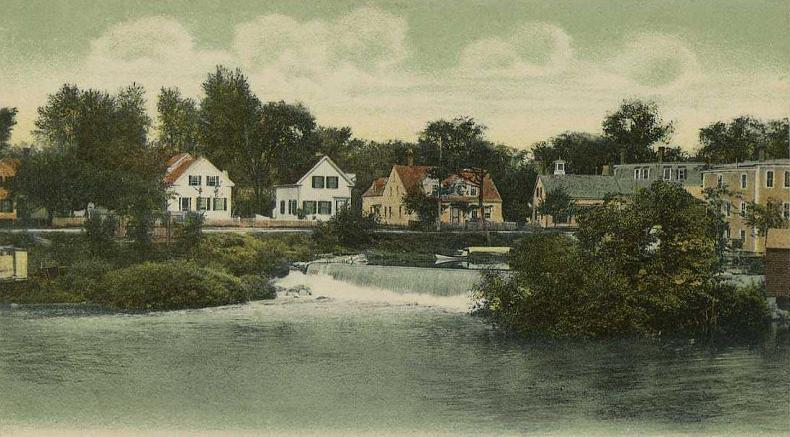
Upper Dam c. 1905

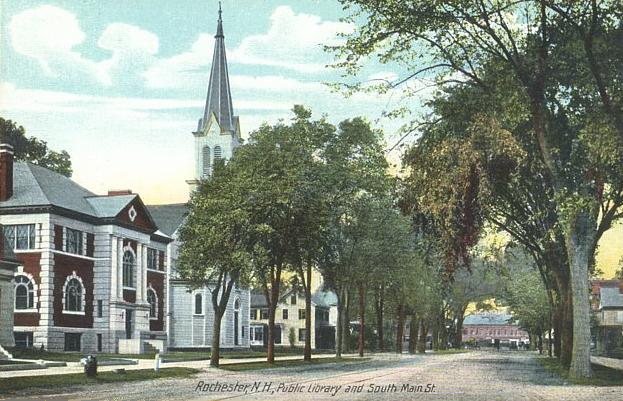
Public Library c. 1908

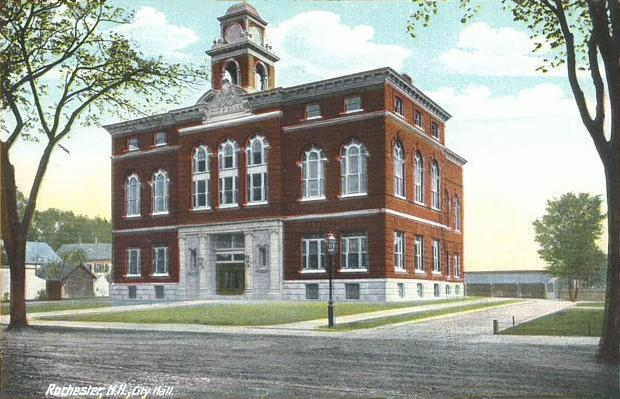
City Hall c. 1910

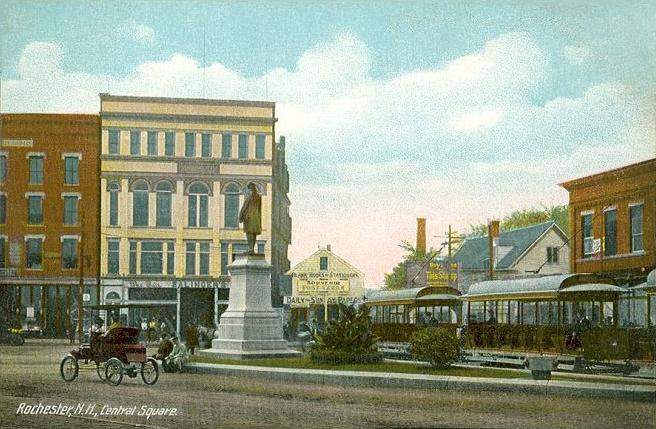
Central Square in 1909

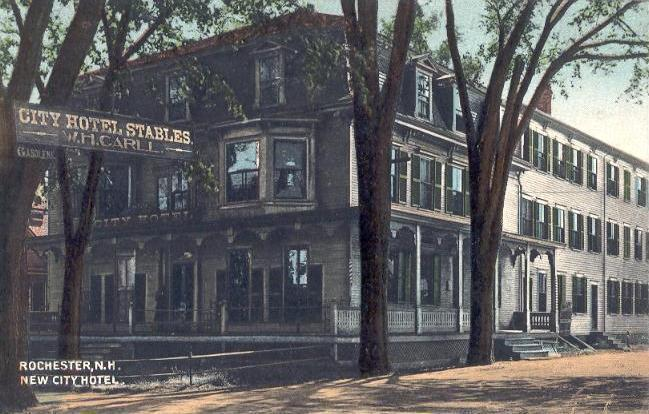
City Hotel c. 1910

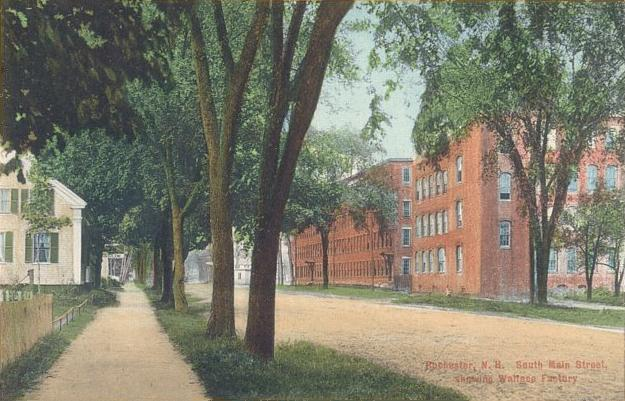
Wallace Factory c. 1910

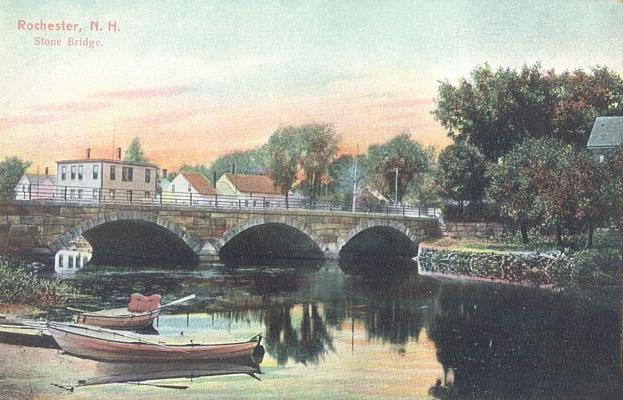
Stone Bridge c. 1910

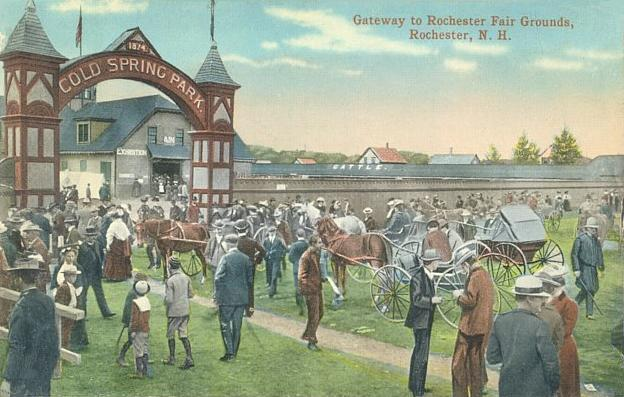
Rochester Fair c. 1910

== Geography ==
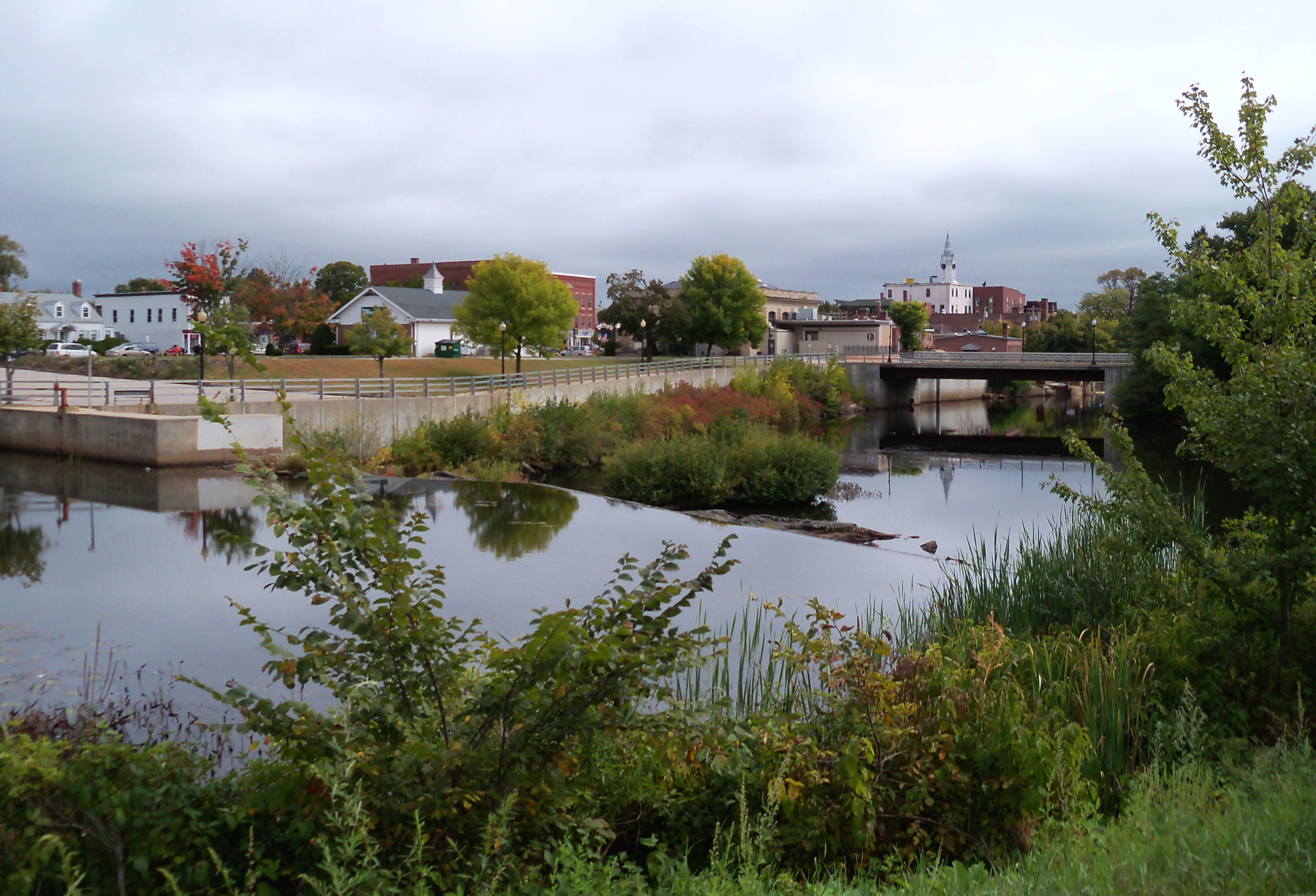
The Cocheco River flows through central Rochester.

According to the United States Census Bureau, the city has a total area of 45.4 square miles (117.7 km^{2}), of which 45.0 square miles (116.6 km^{2}) are land and 0.4 square miles (1.1 km^{2}) are water, comprising 0.91% of the city. Rochester is drained by the Salmon Falls, Isinglass and Cochecho rivers. The highest point in Rochester is 581-foot-high (177 m) Chestnut Hill, occupying the northern corner of the city.

New Hampshire Route 16 (the Spaulding Turnpike) is a six-lane controlled-access highway that passes through the city, leading north towards Conway and south to Dover and Portsmouth. U.S. Route 202 uses the turnpike to bypass the city center, then heads northeastward into Maine and southwestward towards Concord. New Hampshire Route 125 passes north–south through the center of town, leading south to Lee and Epping, and traveling north parallel to NH 16 into Milton. New Hampshire Route 11 leads west to Alton and Laconia and northeast along US 202 into Maine. New Hampshire Route 108 leads southeast to Dover, and New Hampshire Route 202A leads southwest to Strafford and Northwood.

Besides the main downtown part of Rochester, there are two other named communities of significance within the city limits. East Rochester, a small neighborhood, is located near the northeastern border of the city along routes 202 and 11, next to the Salmon Falls River, while Gonic (from the Native American name Squanamagonic) is located south of downtown along NH 125 at a dam on the Cocheco River.

=== Adjacent municipalities ===
- Lebanon, Maine (north)
- Berwick, Maine (northeast)
- Somersworth (east)
- Dover (southeast)
- Barrington (southwest)
- Strafford (west)
- Farmington (northwest)
- Milton (north)

=== Climate ===
Climate data for Rochester, New Hampshire (Skyhaven Airport), 1991–2020 normals, extremes 2000–present
Month	Jan	Feb	Mar	Apr	May	Jun	Jul	Aug	Sep	Oct	Nov	Dec	Year
Record high °F (°C)	67 (19)	75 (24)	85 (29)	93 (34)	95 (35)	100 (38)	100 (38)	100 (38)	96 (36)	87 (31)	81 (27)	72 (22)	100 (38)
Mean maximum °F (°C)	55.1 (12.8)	55.6 (13.1)	65.5 (18.6)	79.9 (26.6)	89.9 (32.2)	91.7 (33.2)	93.9 (34.4)	91.9 (33.3)	88.7 (31.5)	77.9 (25.5)	67.9 (19.9)	57.4 (14.1)	95.7 (35.4)
Mean daily maximum °F (°C)	32.6 (0.3)	35.4 (1.9)	43.5 (6.4)	56.7 (13.7)	67.4 (19.7)	77.0 (25.0)	81.9 (27.7)	80.6 (27.0)	72.6 (22.6)	60.3 (15.7)	48.0 (8.9)	37.4 (3.0)	57.8 (14.3)
Daily mean °F (°C)	24.0 (−4.4)	26.2 (−3.2)	34.1 (1.2)	45.7 (7.6)	56.1 (13.4)	65.6 (18.7)	70.8 (21.6)	69.3 (20.7)	61.5 (16.4)	49.8 (9.9)	39.4 (4.1)	29.6 (−1.3)	47.7 (8.7)
Mean daily minimum °F (°C)	15.4 (−9.2)	17.0 (−8.3)	24.7 (−4.1)	34.7 (1.5)	44.8 (7.1)	54.2 (12.3)	59.6 (15.3)	57.9 (14.4)	50.3 (10.2)	39.4 (4.1)	30.7 (−0.7)	21.9 (−5.6)	37.5 (3.1)
Mean minimum °F (°C)	−4.8 (−20.4)	−0.8 (−18.2)	5.1 (−14.9)	23.7 (−4.6)	32.9 (0.5)	43.1 (6.2)	51.3 (10.7)	47.5 (8.6)	35.5 (1.9)	26.5 (−3.1)	16.2 (−8.8)	4.9 (−15.1)	−7.5 (−21.9)
Record low °F (°C)	−15 (−26)	−13 (−25)	−5 (−21)	15 (−9)	27 (−3)	33 (1)	45 (7)	40 (4)	28 (−2)	19 (−7)	6 (−14)	−12 (−24)	−15 (−26)
Average precipitation inches (mm)	2.53 (64)	2.22 (56)	3.72 (94)	3.67 (93)	3.52 (89)	3.86 (98)	3.52 (89)	3.17 (81)	3.43 (87)	4.39 (112)	3.89 (99)	3.30 (84)	41.22 (1,047)
Average precipitation days (≥ 0.01 in.)	9.9	9.7	11.0	11.9	12.5	13.8	13.4	12.0	11.3	12.0	10.2	10.9	138.6
Source 1: NOAA
Source 2: National Weather Service (mean maxima/minima 2006–2020)

== Demographics ==
Historical population
Census	Pop.	Note	%±
1790	2,857		—
1800	2,646		−7.4%
1810	2,118		−20.0%
1820	2,471		16.7%
1830	2,155		−12.8%
1840	2,431		12.8%
1850	3,006		23.7%
1860	3,384		12.6%
1870	4,103		21.2%
1880	5,784		41.0%
1890	7,396		27.9%
1900	8,466		14.5%
1910	8,868		4.7%
1920	9,673		9.1%
1930	10,209		5.5%
1940	12,012		17.7%
1950	13,776		14.7%
1960	15,927		15.6%
1970	17,938		12.6%
1980	21,560		20.2%
1990	26,630		23.5%
2000	28,461		6.9%
2010	29,752		4.5%
2020	32,492		9.2%
U.S. Decennial Census

=== 2020 census ===
As of the 2020 census, Rochester had a population of 32,492. The median age was 43.8 years. 18.4% of residents were under the age of 18 and 19.3% of residents were 65 years of age or older. For every 100 females there were 96.5 males, and for every 100 females age 18 and over there were 93.7 males age 18 and over.

88.7% of residents lived in urban areas, while 11.3% lived in rural areas.

There were 13,839 households in Rochester, of which 24.3% had children under the age of 18 living in them. Of all households, 43.2% were married-couple households, 19.0% were households with a male householder and no spouse or partner present, and 26.8% were households with a female householder and no spouse or partner present. About 29.3% of all households were made up of individuals and 12.4% had someone living alone who was 65 years of age or older.

There were 14,582 housing units, of which 5.1% were vacant. The homeowner vacancy rate was 1.1% and the rental vacancy rate was 5.7%.

Racial composition as of the 2020 census
Race	Number	Percent
White	29,352	90.3%
Black or African American	343	1.1%
American Indian and Alaska Native	67	0.2%
Asian	528	1.6%
Native Hawaiian and Other Pacific Islander	12	0.0%
Some other race	248	0.8%
Two or more races	1,942	6.0%
Hispanic or Latino (of any race)	1,016	3.1%

=== 2010 census ===
As of the 2010 census, there were 29,752 people, 12,378 households, and 7,936 families residing in the city. There were 13,372 housing units, of which 994, or 7.4%, were vacant. The racial makeup of the town was 95.4% White, 0.8% African American, 0.3% Native American, 1.2% Asian, 0.1% Native Hawaiian or Pacific Islander, 0.4% some other race, and 1.7% from two or more races. 1.8% of the population were Hispanic or Latino of any race.

Of the 12,378 households, 29.9% had children under the age of 18 living with them, 46.8% were headed by married couples living together, 12.2% had a female householder with no husband present, and 35.9% were non-families. 27.8% of all households were made up of individuals, and 10.6% were someone living alone who was 65 years of age or older. The average household size was 2.38, and the average family size was 2.89.

In the town, 22.0% of the population were under the age of 18, 7.6% were from 18 to 24, 26.2% from 25 to 44, 29.3% from 45 to 64, and 14.8% were 65 years of age or older. The median age was 40.7 years. For every 100 females, there were 93.5 males. For every 100 females age 18 and over, there were 89.6 males.

=== 2011–2015 American Community Survey estimates ===
For the period 2011–2015, the estimated median annual income for a household was $46,979, and the median income for a family was $59,519. Male full-time workers had a median income of $42,948 versus $34,688 for females. The per capita income for the town was $26,580. 13.2% of the population and 12.3% of families were below the poverty line. 22.2% of the population under the age of 18 and 8.8% of those 65 or older were living in poverty.

== Economy ==
Major employers in Rochester include Frisbie Memorial Hospital, Albany International, Market Basket, Walmart, Thompson Investment Casting, Spaulding Composites, Rochester Manor, NextPhase Medical Devices, Monarch School of New England, Lydall Performance Materials, Lowe's, Laars Heating Systems, Kohl's, Homemakers & Health Services, The Home Depot, Hannaford, Eastern Propane & Oil, Cornerstone VNA, the City of Rochester, and Rochester School District.

== Transportation ==
Cooperative Alliance for Seacoast Transportation provides local bus service.

== Government ==
Rochester city vote by party in presidential elections
Year	Democratic	Republican	Third Parties
2024	47.7% 8,264	51.1% 8,881	1.3% 233
2020	48.3% 8,132	49.7% 8,367	2.1% 346
2016	41.26% 6,267	51.28% 7,789	7.47% 1,134
2012	51.47% 7,493	46.82% 6,816	1.72% 250
2008	54.32% 7,947	44.31% 6,483	1.37% 200
2004	49.58% 6,672	49.48% 6,658	0.94% 126
2000	47.01% 5,401	48.06% 5,522	4.93% 567
1996	52.86% 5,489	35.15% 3,650	11.99% 1,245
1992	40.03% 4,588	37.27% 4,272	22.69% 2,601
1988	39.75% 3,591	59.41% 5,368	0.84% 76
1984	32.37% 2,622	67.38% 5,457	0.25% 20
1980	33.11% 2,566	58.01% 4,495	8.88% 688
1976	48.44% 3,641	50.57% 3,801	0.99% 74
1972	37.87% 2,996	61.41% 4,858	0.72% 57
1968	50.84% 3,703	46.50% 3,387	2.66% 194
1964	68.10% 4,827	31.90% 2,261	0.00% 0
1960	50.35% 3,799	49.65% 3,746	0.00% 0

In the New Hampshire Senate, Rochester is in the 6th District and is currently represented by Republican Jim Gray. On the New Hampshire Executive Council, Rochester is in District 2 and is currently represented by Democrat Karen Liot Hill. In the U.S. House of Representatives, Rochester is included in New Hampshire's 1st congressional district and is currently represented by Democrat Chris Pappas.

== Notable people ==
- Isaac Adams (1802–1883), invented the Adams Power Press
- Allard Baird (born 1961), vice president of the Arizona Diamondbacks
- Jeff Coffin (born 1965), saxophonist with the Dave Matthews Band
- Casey DeSmith (born 1991), ice hockey goaltender for the Dallas Stars
- James Farrington (1791–1859), U.S. congressman
- Samuel D. Felker (1859–1932), mayor and 54th governor of New Hampshire
- James Foley (1973–c. 2014), photojournalist murdered by the group Islamic State of Iraq and Syria
- John P. Hale (1806–1873), U.S. senator
- Charles Francis Hall (c. 1821–1871), Arctic explorer
- Lyndon LaRouche (1922–2019), political activist, perennial presidential candidate
- Daniel Lothrop (1831–1892), publisher; born in Rochester
- George A. Lovejoy (1931–2015), New Hampshire state senator, businessman
- Freddy Meyer (born 1981), defenseman with the Philadelphia Flyers
- Gertrude Jenness Rinden (1901–1992), missionary, educator, writer
- Brandon Rogers (born 1982), defenseman with the Anaheim Ducks
- Carol Shea-Porter (born 1952), U.S. congresswoman
- Huntley N. Spaulding (1869–1955), 61st governor of New Hampshire
- Rolland H. Spaulding (1873–1942), 55th governor of New Hampshire
- John Tuttle (1951–2022), Maine state legislator; born in Rochester
- John Hanson Twombly (1814–1893), president of the University of Wisconsin
- Nathaniel Upham (1774–1829), U.S. congressman

== Sites of interest ==
- Rochester Common
- Rochester Historical Society Museum
- Rochester Museum of Fine Arts
- Rochester Opera House
- Rochester Skate Park
- Roger Allen Sports Facility
- Spaulding High School
- New Hampshire Historical Marker No. 42: The Spaulding Brothers
- New Hampshire Historical Marker No. 191: Arched Bridge
