= Mission Detroit =

Mission Detroit was a pre-dawn glider-borne combat assault in the American airborne landings in Normandy, made by elements of the U.S. 82nd Airborne Division on the early morning of June 6, 1944, during World War II. It was part of Operation Neptune, the assault portion of the Allied invasion of Normandy, Operation Overlord. Originally slated to be the main assault for the 82nd Airborne, the glider operation instead became the first reinforcement mission after the main parachute combat assault, Mission Boston. The landing zone for mission Detroit was near Sainte-Mère-Église, to the west of Utah Beach.

The objective of the division was to secure the town of Sainte-Mère-Église and to take the bridges along the Merderet River. By doing this, the U.S. 4th Infantry Division coming in at Utah Beach would have easy access to making their way northwards towards the ports at Cherbourg.

Casualties for the 82nd Airborne Division on D-Day were about 1,260 of 6,600, or about 20%. On 6 June 1944 the heavier elements of the division landed by glider in Mission Elmira.

== Air movement table - mission Detroit ==
Serial	Airborne Unit	Troop carrier Group	# of C-47s	# of gliders	UK Base	Drop Zone	Drop Zone Time
28	Batteries A & B, 80th AAA Bn; Elements Div HQ; Elements Div Artillery; Elements 82nd Signal Bn	437th TCG	52	52 Waco	RAF Ramsbury	O	0407

SOURCE: D-Day Etat des Lieux

== See also ==
- Mission Chicago
- Mission Elmira
- Operation Tonga
