= Utah Beach =

Westernmost D-Day landing site during WWII

- Part of Normandy landings
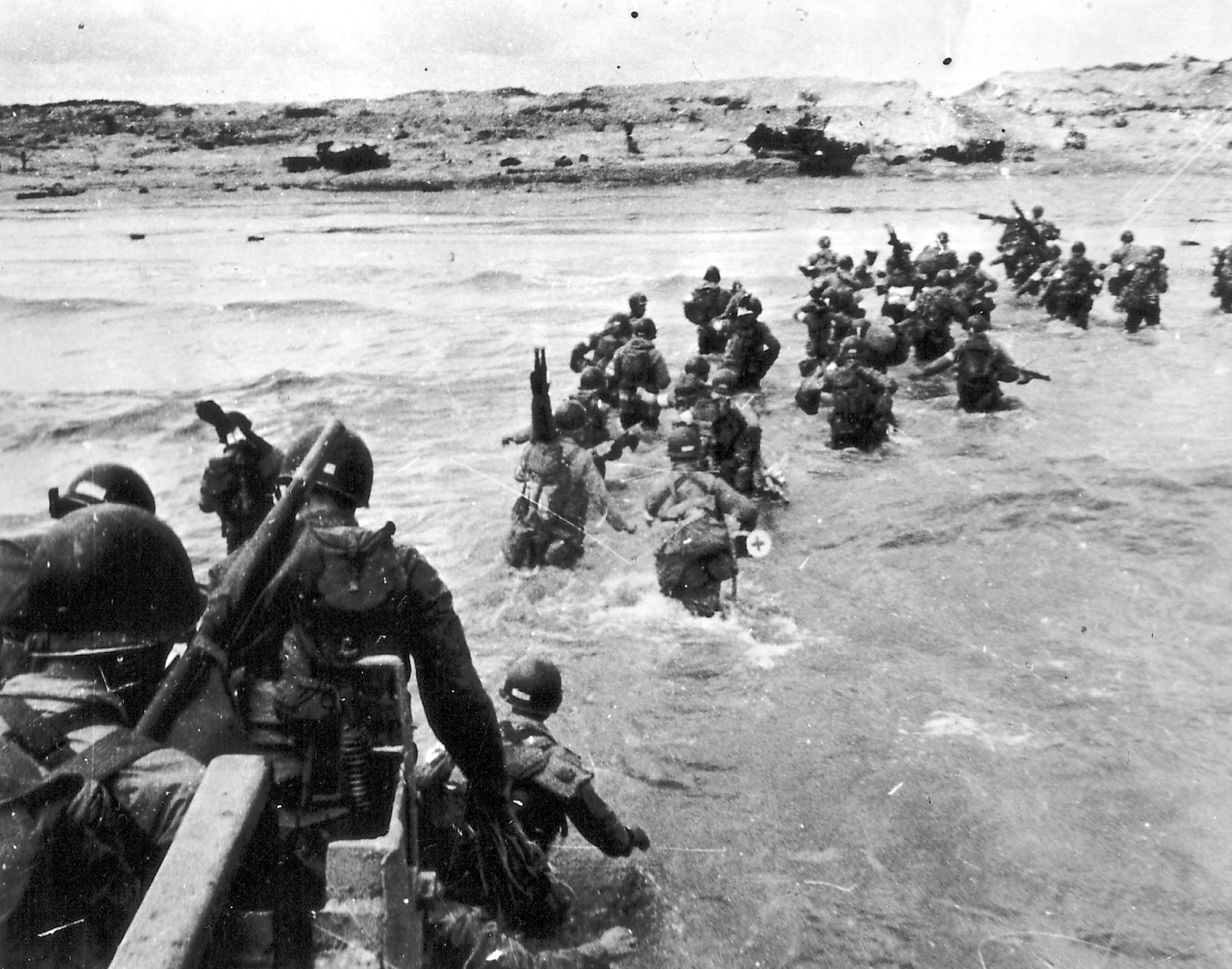
- US soldiers landing on Utah
Date	June 6, 1944
Location	Pouppeville, La Madeleine, Manche, France 49°25′05″N 1°10′35″W
Result	Allied victory

Belligerents
United States; United Kingdom	Germany

Commanders and leaders
(United States) J. Lawton Collins; (United States) Don P. Moon; (United States) Raymond O. Barton; (United States) Jay W. MacKelvie; (United States) Theodore Roosevelt Jr.	(Nazi Germany) Karl-Wilhelm von Schlieben

Units involved
(United States) VII Corps Beach: 4th Infantry Division; 90th Infantry Division; 4th Cavalry Regiment; Air drops: 82nd Airborne Division; 101st Airborne Division	(Nazi Germany) LXXXIV Corps: 91st Infantry Division; 919th Gren. Regiment; Two Battalions

Strength
4th Infantry Division: 21,000; Airborne: 14,000	12,320

Casualties and losses
4th Infantry Division: 197; Airborne: c. 2,499; Other units: c. 700	Unknown

Utah, commonly known as Utah Beach, was the code name for one of the five sectors of the Allied invasion of German-occupied France in the Normandy landings on June 6, 1944 (D-Day), during World War II. The westernmost of the five code-named landing beaches in Normandy, Utah is on the Cotentin Peninsula, west of the mouths of the Douve and Vire rivers. Amphibious landings at Utah were undertaken by United States Army troops, with sea transport, mine sweeping, and a naval bombardment force provided by the United States Navy and the United States Coast Guard as well as elements from the British, Dutch and other Allied navies.

The objective at Utah was to secure a beachhead on the Cotentin Peninsula, the location of important port facilities at Cherbourg. The amphibious assault, primarily by the US 4th Infantry Division and 70th Tank Battalion, was supported by airborne landings of the 82nd and 101st Airborne Division. The intention was to rapidly seal off the Cotentin Peninsula, prevent the Germans from reinforcing Cherbourg, and capture the port as quickly as possible. Utah, along with Sword on the eastern flank, was added to the invasion plan in December 1943. These changes doubled the frontage of the invasion and necessitated a month-long delay so that additional landing craft and personnel could be assembled in England. Allied forces attacking Utah faced two battalions of the 919th Grenadier Regiment, part of the 709th Static Infantry Division. While improvements to fortifications had been undertaken under the leadership of Field Marshal Erwin Rommel beginning in October 1943, the troops assigned to defend the area were mostly poorly equipped non-German conscripts.

D-Day at Utah began at 01:30, when the first of the airborne units arrived, tasked with securing the key crossroads at Sainte-Mère-Église and controlling the causeways through the flooded farmland behind Utah so the infantry could advance inland. While some airborne objectives were quickly met, many paratroopers landed far from their drop zones and were unable to fulfill their objectives on the first day. On the beach itself, infantry and tanks landed in four waves beginning at 06:30 and quickly secured the immediate area with minimal casualties. Meanwhile, engineers set to work clearing the area of obstacles and mines, and additional waves of reinforcements continued to arrive. At the close of D-Day, Allied forces had only captured about half of the planned area and contingents of German defenders remained, but the beachhead was secure.

The 4th Infantry Division landed 21,000 troops on Utah at the cost of only 197 casualties. Airborne troops arriving by parachute and glider numbered an additional 14,000 men, with 2,500 casualties. Around 700 men were lost in engineering units, the 70th Tank Battalion, and seaborne vessels sunk by the enemy. German losses are unknown. Cherbourg was captured on June 26, but by this time the Germans had destroyed the port facilities, which were not brought back into full operation until September.

== Allied planning ==
The decision to undertake a cross-channel invasion of continental Europe within the next year was taken at the Trident Conference, held in Washington in May 1943. The Allies initially planned to launch the invasion on May 1, 1944, and a draft of the plan was accepted at the Quebec Conference in August 1943. General Dwight D. Eisenhower was appointed commander of Supreme Headquarters Allied Expeditionary Force (SHAEF). General Bernard Montgomery was named as commander of the 21st Army Group, which comprised all of the land forces involved in the invasion.

On December 31, 1943, Eisenhower and Montgomery first saw the plan, which proposed amphibious landings by three divisions and two-thirds of an airborne division. The two generals immediately insisted that the scale of the initial invasion be expanded to five divisions, with airborne descents by three divisions, to allow operations on a wider front. The change doubled the frontage of the invasion from 25 miles (40 km) to 50 miles (80 km). This would allow for quicker offloading of men and materiel, make it more difficult for the Germans to respond, and speed up the capture of the port at Cherbourg. Eisenhower and Lieutenant General Omar Bradley selected for Utah the VII Corps. Major General J. Lawton Collins, who had experience with amphibious operations in the Pacific Theater of Operations (though not in the initial assaults), replaced Major General Roscoe Woodruff as commander of VII Corps.

The coastline of Normandy was divided into seventeen sectors, with codenames using a spelling alphabet—from Able, west of Omaha, to Roger on the east flank of Sword. Utah was originally designated "Yoke" and Omaha was "X-ray", from the phonetic alphabet. The two names were changed on 3 March 1944. "Omaha" and "Utah" were probably suggested by Bradley. Eight further sectors were added when the invasion was extended to include Utah. Sectors were further subdivided into beaches identified by the colors Green, Red, and White.

Utah, the westernmost of the five landing beaches, is on the Cotentin Peninsula, west of the mouths of the Douve and Vire rivers. The terrain between Utah and the neighboring Omaha was swampy and difficult to cross, which meant that the troops landing at Utah would be isolated. The Germans had flooded the farmland behind Utah, restricting travel off the beach to a few narrow causeways. To help secure the terrain inland of the landing zone, rapidly seal off the Cotentin Peninsula, and prevent the Germans from reinforcing the port at Cherbourg, two airborne divisions were assigned to airdrop into German territory in the early hours of the invasion.

The need to acquire or produce extra landing craft and troop carrier aircraft for the expanded operation meant that the invasion had to be delayed to June. Production of landing craft was ramped up in late 1943 and continued into early 1944, and existing craft were relocated from other theaters. More than 600 Douglas C-47 Skytrain transport aircraft and their crews took a circuitous route to England in early 1944 from Baer Field, Indiana, bringing the number of available troop carrier planes to over a thousand.

=== Plan of attack ===
Amphibious landings at Utah were to be preceded by airborne landings further inland on the Cotentin Peninsula commencing shortly after midnight. Forty minutes of naval bombardment was to begin at 05:50, followed by air bombardment, scheduled for 06:09 to 06:27.

The amphibious landing was planned in four waves, beginning at 06:30. The first consisted of 20 Landing Craft, Vehicle, Personnel (LCVPs) carrying four companies from the 8th Infantry Regiment. The ten craft on the right were to land on Tare Green beach, opposite the strongpoint at Les Dunes de Varreville. The ten craft on the left were intended for Uncle Red beach, 1,000 yards (910 m) south. Eight Landing craft tanks (LCTs), each carrying four amphibious DD tanks of the 70th Tank Battalion, were scheduled to land a few minutes before the infantry.

The second wave, scheduled for 06:35, consisted of 32 LCVPs carrying four more companies of 8th Infantry, as well as combat engineers and naval demolition teams that were to clear the beach of obstacles. The third wave, scheduled for 06:45, consisted of eight LCTs bringing more DD tanks plus armored bulldozers to assist in clearing paths off the beach. It was to be followed at 06:47 by the fourth wave, which had eight Landing craft mechanized (LCM) and three LCVPs with detachments of the 237th and 299th Combat Engineer Battalions, assigned to clear the beach between the high and low water marks.

Troops involved in Operation Overlord, including members of the 4th Division scheduled to land at Utah, left their barracks in the second half of May and proceeded to their coastal marshalling points. To preserve secrecy, the invasion troops were as much as possible kept out of contact with the outside world. The men began to embark onto their transports on June 1, and the 865 ships of Force U (the naval group assigned to Utah) left from Plymouth on June 3 and 4.

A 24-hour postponement of the invasion necessitated by bad weather meant that one convoy had to be recalled and then hastily refueled at Portland. Convoy U2A from Salcombe and Dartmouth left on 4 June but did not receive the broadcast recall notices, and was headed for France alone. An all-day search by a Walrus reconnaissance biplane located the convoy and dropped two coded messages in canisters; the second one was acknowledged when the convoy was 36 miles (58 km) from Normandy. The convoy of about 150 vessels was carrying the 4th Infantry Division of Major-General Raymond O. Barton.

The ships met at a rendezvous point (nicknamed "Piccadilly Circus") southeast of the Isle of Wight to assemble into convoys to cross the Channel. Minesweepers began clearing lanes on the evening of June 5.

== German preparations ==
Field Marshal Gerd von Rundstedt, overall commander on the Western Front, reported to Hitler in October 1943 regarding the weak defenses in France. This led to the appointment of Field Marshal Erwin Rommel to oversee the construction of enhanced fortifications along the Atlantic Wall, with special emphasis on the most likely invasion front, which stretched from the Netherlands to Cherbourg. Rommel believed that the Normandy coast could be a possible landing point for the invasion, so he ordered the construction of extensive defensive works along that shore. In addition to concrete gun emplacements at strategic points along the coast, he ordered wooden stakes, metal tripods, mines, and large anti-tank obstacles to be placed on the beach to delay the approach of landing craft and impede the movement of tanks. Expecting the Allies to land at high tide so that the infantry would spend less time exposed on the beach, he ordered many of these obstacles to be placed at the high-tide mark. The terrain at Utah is flat, offering no high ground on which to place fortifications. The shallow beach varies in depth from almost nothing to 800 yards (730 m), depending on the tides. The Germans flooded the flat land behind the beach by damming up streams and opening the floodgates at the mouth of the Douve to admit seawater.

Defense of this sector of eastern coast of the Cotentin Peninsula was assigned to Generalleutnant Karl-Wilhelm von Schlieben and his 709th Static Infantry Division. The unit was not well equipped, lacking motorized transport and provided with captured French, Soviet, and Czech equipment. Many of the men were Ostlegionen (non-German conscripts recruited from Soviet prisoners of war, Georgians, and Poles), known to be deeply unreliable. The southernmost 6 miles (9.7 km) of the sector was manned by about 700 troops stationed in nine strongpoints spaced from 1,100 to 4,400 yd (1,000 to 4,000 m) apart. Tangles of barbed wire, booby traps, and the removal of ground cover made both the beach and the terrain around the strongpoints hazardous for infantry. The German 91st Infantry Division and 6th Fallschirmjäger Regiment, who arrived in May, were stationed inland as reserves. Detecting this move, the Allies shifted their intended airborne drop zones to the southeast.

== D-Day (June 6, 1944) ==
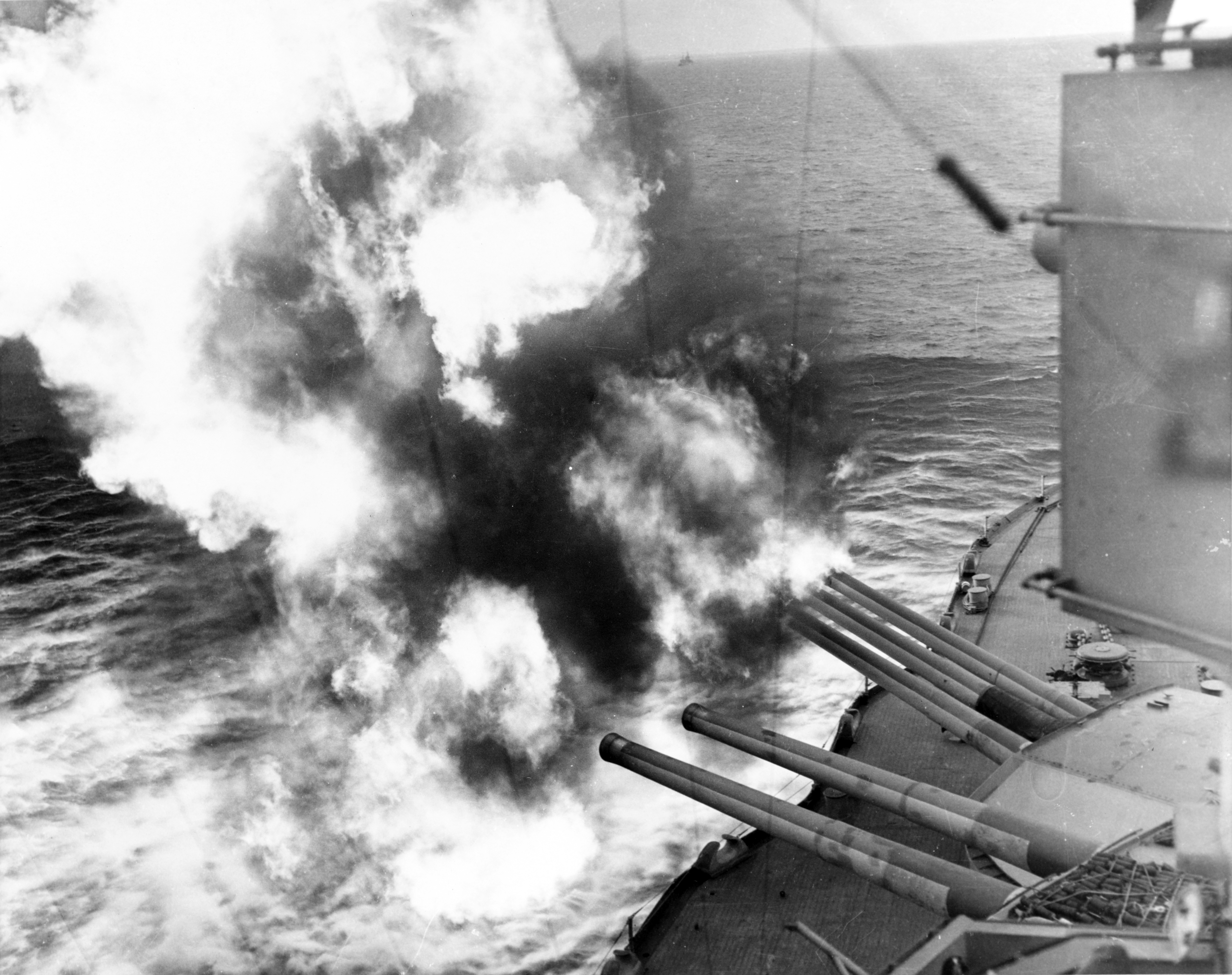
Nevada fires upon shore.

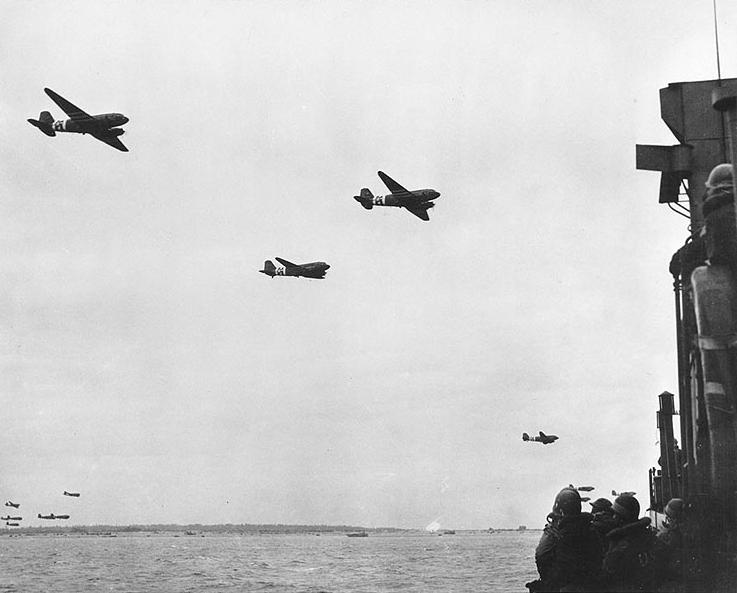
C-47 Skytrains with paratroops above a landing craft.

Bombing of Normandy began around midnight with over 2,200 British and American bombers attacking targets along the coast and further inland. Some 1,200 aircraft departed England just before midnight to transport the airborne divisions to their drop zones behind enemy lines. Paratroops from 101st Airborne were dropped beginning around 01:30, tasked with controlling the causeways behind Utah and destroying road and rail bridges over the Douve. Gathering together into fighting units was made difficult by a shortage of radios and by the bocage terrain, with its hedgerows, stone walls, and marshes. Troops of the 82nd Airborne began arriving around 02:30, with the primary objective of destroying two additional bridges over the Douve and capturing intact two bridges over the Merderet. They quickly captured the important crossroads at Sainte-Mère-Église (the first town liberated in the invasion) and began working to protect the western flank. Generalleutnant Wilhelm Falley, commander of 91st Infantry Division, was trying to return to his headquarters near Picauville from war games at Rennes when he was killed by a paratrooper patrol. Two hours before the main invasion force landed, a raiding party of 132 members of 4th Cavalry Regiment swam ashore at 04:30 at Îles Saint-Marcouf, thought to be a German observation post. It was unoccupied, but two men were killed and seventeen wounded by mines and German artillery fire.

Once the four troop transports assigned to Force U reached their assigned position 12 miles (19 km) off the coast, 5,000 soldiers of 4th Division and other units assigned to Utah boarded their landing craft in rough seas for the three-hour journey to their designated landing point. The twenty ships assigned to bombard Utah included the US Navy battleship Nevada, the Royal Navy monitor Erebus, the heavy cruisers Hawkins (Royal Navy) and Tuscaloosa (US Navy), and the gunboat HNLMS Soemba (Royal Netherlands Navy). Naval bombardment of areas behind the beach commenced at 05:45, while it was still dark, with the gunners switching to pre-assigned targets on the beach as soon as it was light enough to see, at 05:50. USS Corry, a destroyer in the bombardment group, sank after it struck a mine while evading fire from the Marcouf battery under the command of Oberleutnant zur See Walter Ohmsen. Since troops were scheduled to land at Utah and Omaha starting at 06:30 (an hour earlier than the British beaches), these areas received only about 40 minutes of naval bombardment before the assault troops began to land on the shore. Coastal air bombardment was undertaken in the twenty minutes immediately prior to the landing by approximately 300 Martin B-26 Marauders of the IX Bomber Command. Due to cloud cover, the pilots decided to drop to low altitudes of 4,000 to 6,000 feet (1,200 to 1,800 m). Much of the bombing was highly effective, with the loss of only two aircraft.

=== Landing ===
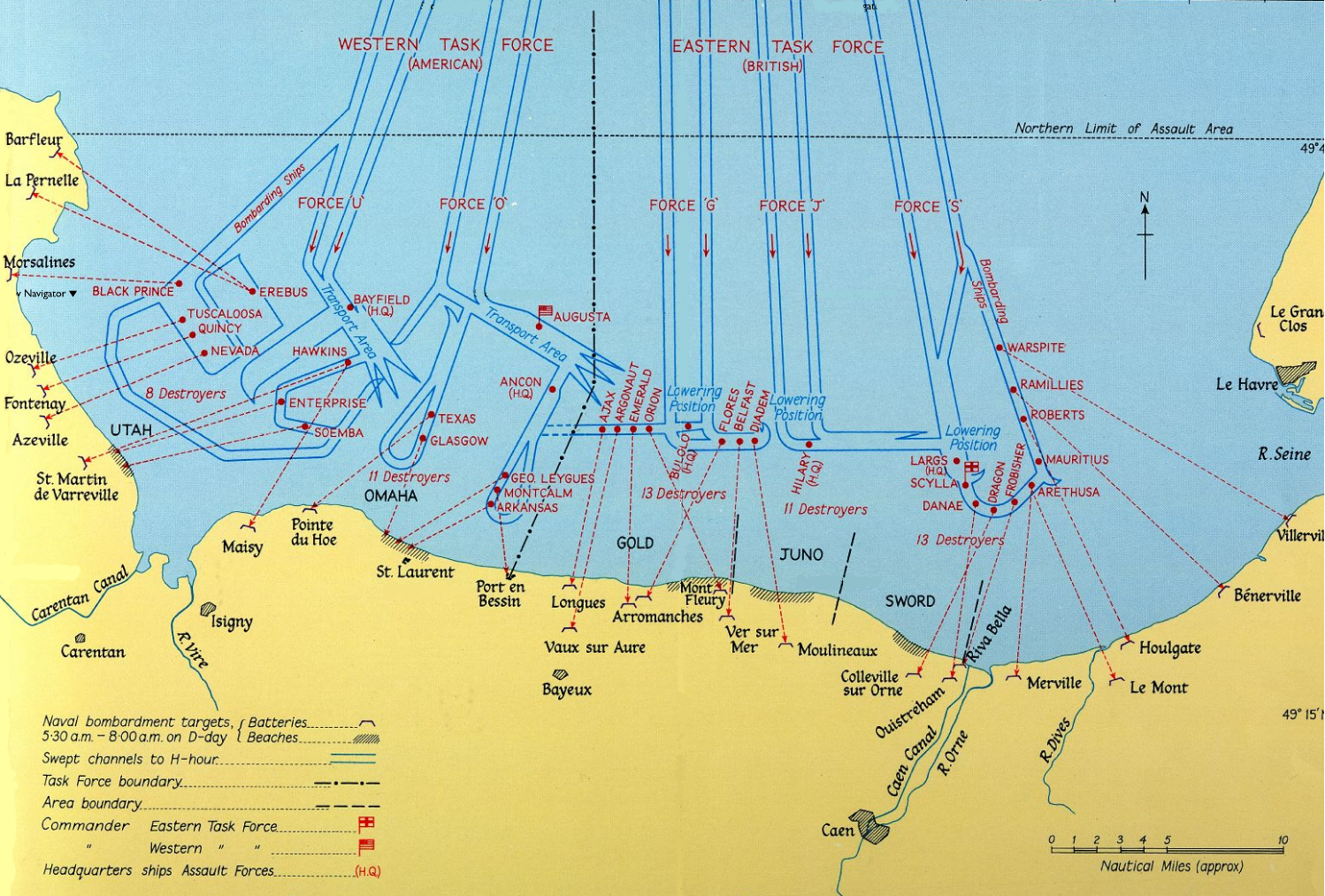
Map of the invasion area showing channels cleared of mines, location of vessels engaged in bombardment, and targets on shore. Utah is the westernmost landing area.

The first troops to reach the shore were four companies from the 2nd Battalion, 8th Infantry, arriving at 06:30 on 20 LCVPs. Companies B and C landed on the segment code-named Tare Green, and Companies E and F to their left on Uncle Red. Leonard T. Schroeder, leading Company F, was the first man to reach the beach. The landing craft were pushed to the south by strong currents, and they found themselves near Exit 2 at Grande Dune, about 2,000 yards (1.8 km) from their intended landing zones opposite Exit 3 at Les Dunes de Varreville. The first senior officer ashore, Assistant Division Commander Brigadier General Theodore Roosevelt Jr. of the 4th Infantry Division, personally scouted the nearby terrain. He determined that this landing site was actually better, as there was only one strongpoint in the immediate vicinity rather than two, and it had been badly damaged by bombers of IX Bomber Command. In addition, the strong currents had washed ashore many of the underwater obstacles. Deciding to "start the war from right here", he ordered further landings to be re-routed.

The second wave of assault troops arrived at 06:35 on 32 LCVPs. Companies A and D of 1st Battalion, 8th Infantry landed on Tare Green and G and H on Uncle Red. They were accompanied by engineers and demolition teams tasked with removing beach obstacles and clearing the area directly behind the beach of obstacles and mines.

A contingent of the 70th Tank Battalion, comprising 32 amphibious DD tanks on eight LCTs, were supposed to arrive about 10 minutes before the infantry. However, a strong headwind caused them to be about 20 minutes late, even though they launched the tanks 1,500 yards (1,400 m) from shore rather than 5,000 yards (4,600 m) as planned. Four tanks of Company A and their personnel were lost when their LCT hit a mine about 3 miles (4.8 km) south of Iles St. Marcouf and was destroyed, but the remaining 28 arrived intact.

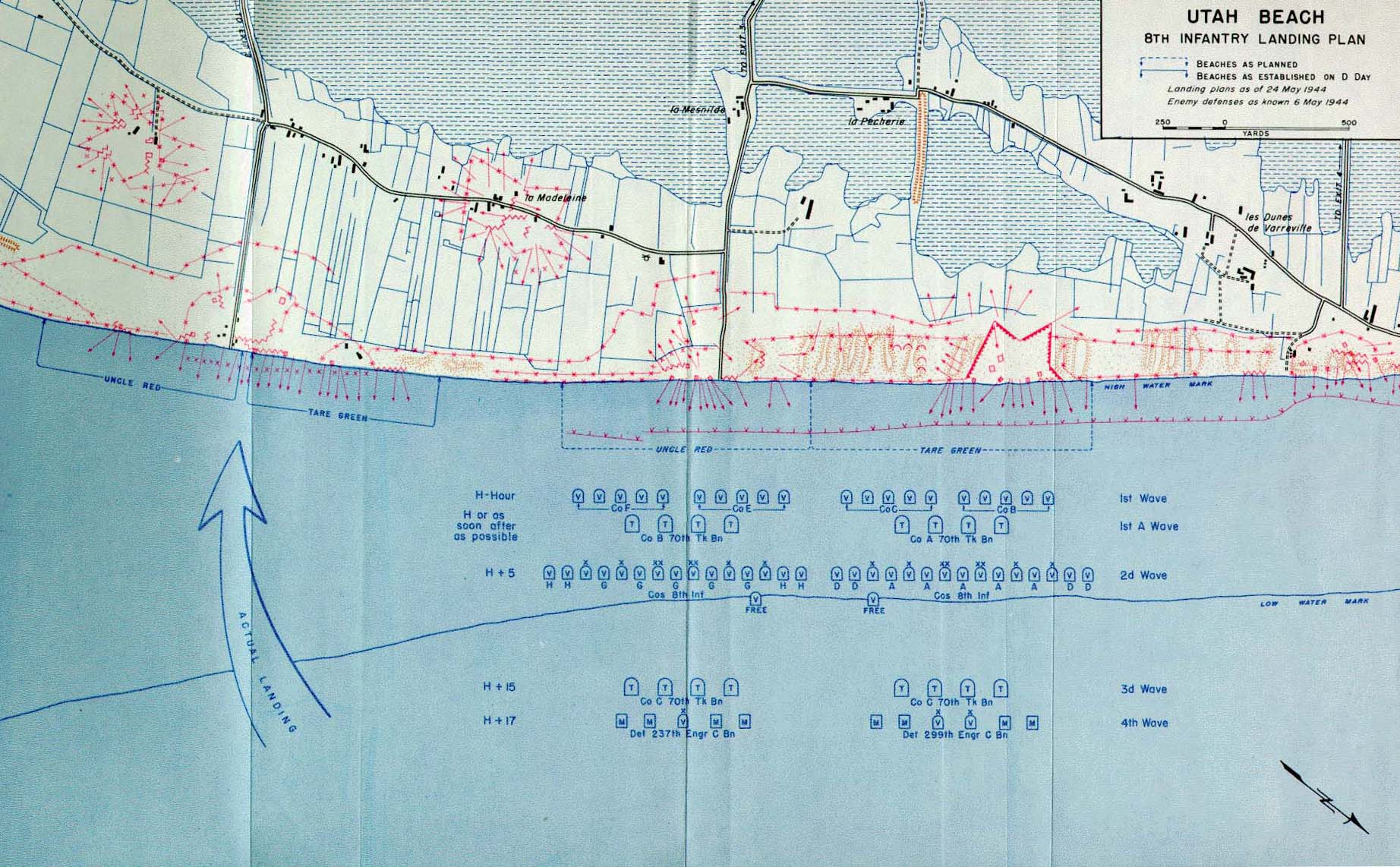
Utah landings, planned (center/right) and actual (left). North: lower right

The third wave, arriving at 06:45, included 16 conventional M4 Sherman tanks and 8 dozer tanks of the 70th Tank Battalion. They were followed at 06:47 by the fourth wave, which had eight LCMs and three LCVPs with detachments of the 237th and 299th Combat Engineer Battalions, assigned to clear the beach between the high and low water marks.

Company B came under small arms fire from defenders positioned in houses along the road as they headed to the enemy strongpoint WN7 near La Madeleine, northwest of La Grande Dune and 600 yards (550 m) inland. They met little resistance at WN7, the headquarters of 3rd Battalion, 919th Grenadiers. Company C disabled the enemy strongpoint WN5 at La Grande Dune, which had been heavily damaged in the preliminary bombardment. Companies E and F (about 600 men) proceeded inland about 700 yards (640 m) to strongpoint WN4 at La Dune, which they captured after a short skirmish. They next traveled south on a farm road parallel to the beach towards Causeway 1. Companies G and H moved south along the beach toward enemy strongpoint WN3 at Beau Guillot. They encountered a minefield and came under enemy machine gun fire, but soon captured the position. 70th Tank Battalion was expecting to have to help neutralize beach fortifications in the immediate area, but since this job was quickly completed by the infantry, they had little to do initially. The landing area was almost totally secure by 08:30, at which point combat teams prepared to push further inland along the causeways. Meanwhile, additional waves of reinforcements continued to arrive on the beach.

Removal of mines and obstacles from the beach, a job that had to be performed quickly before the tide came in at 10:30, was the assignment of 237th and 299th Combat Engineer Battalions and the eight dozer tanks. The teams used explosives to destroy beach obstacles and blow gaps in the sea wall to allow quicker access for troops and vehicles. The dozer tanks pushed the wreckage out of the way to create clear lanes for further landings.

=== Moving inland ===
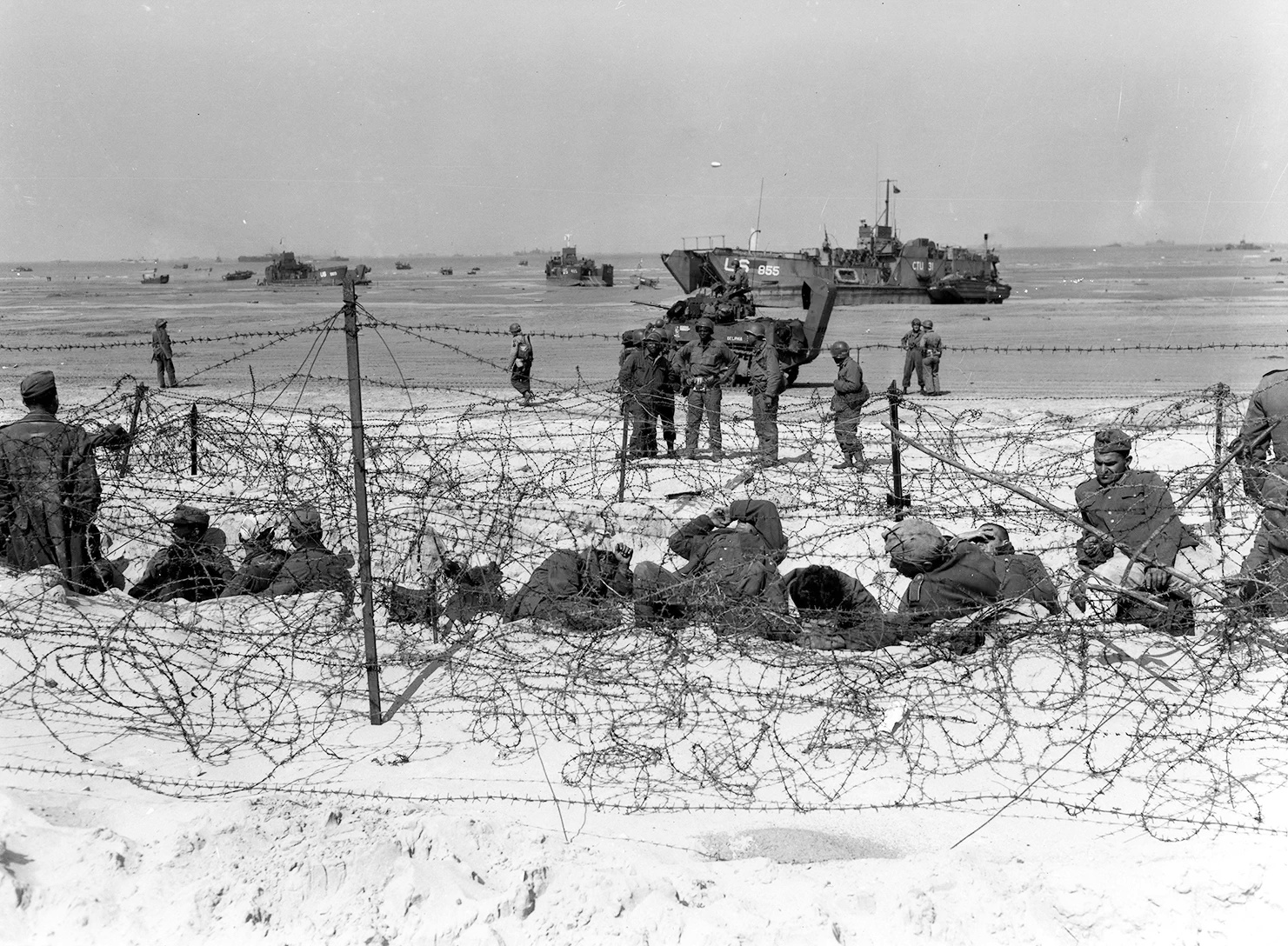
German prisoners of war in an enclosure on Utah.

The next move for the 4th Division was to begin movement down the three causeways through the flooded farmland behind the beach to link up with the 101st Airborne, who had dropped behind enemy lines before dawn. 2nd Battalion and several tanks headed down Causeway 1 towards Pouppeville, which they discovered had already been captured by the 3/501st Parachute Infantry Regiment. A dozen German infantrymen, trapped between the two Allied forces, surrendered. Causeway 2, directly behind La Grande Dune, eventually became the main exit road off the beach. Securing this causeway required the capture of Ste. Marie du Mont, about 3 miles (4.8 km) inland. The Germans had blown a small bridge over a culvert, and movement was delayed while engineers made a repair and cleared two inoperable tanks from the road. Causeway 2 quickly became congested, so some units opted to walk through the flooded areas beside the road. Several hundred defenders were positioned in and around Ste. Marie du Mont, including 6th Fallschirmjäger Regiment of the 91st Infantry Division. Members of the 506th Parachute Infantry successfully attacked batteries at Holdy and Brécourt Manor and took Ste. Marie du Mont in house-to-house and street combat, clearing the way for 8th Infantry, 3rd Battalion to advance up Causeway 2 practically unopposed. 8th Infantry, 1st Battalion headed up Causeway 3 towards Audouville-la-Hubert, which had already been captured by the 502nd Parachute Infantry. As at Pouppeville, enemy soldiers (in this case several dozen) were caught between the two converging forces and had to surrender.

Meanwhile, 22nd Infantry, 3rd Battalion and five tanks moved north along the beach, tasked with eliminating as many German strongpoints as possible. They discovered that tank fire could only destroy the concrete pillboxes via a direct hit on the embrasures, so they called for artillery fire from the naval vessels offshore. By evening they had combined with 12th Infantry, who had traveled directly across the flooded fields to a position far short of their target for the day, to form a defensive perimeter on the northern end of the beachhead. On the southern end of the beachhead, about 3,000 men of the 6th Fallschirmjäger Regiment moved into position near Saint-Côme-du-Mont, preventing the 501st Parachute Infantry from advancing any further on D-Day.

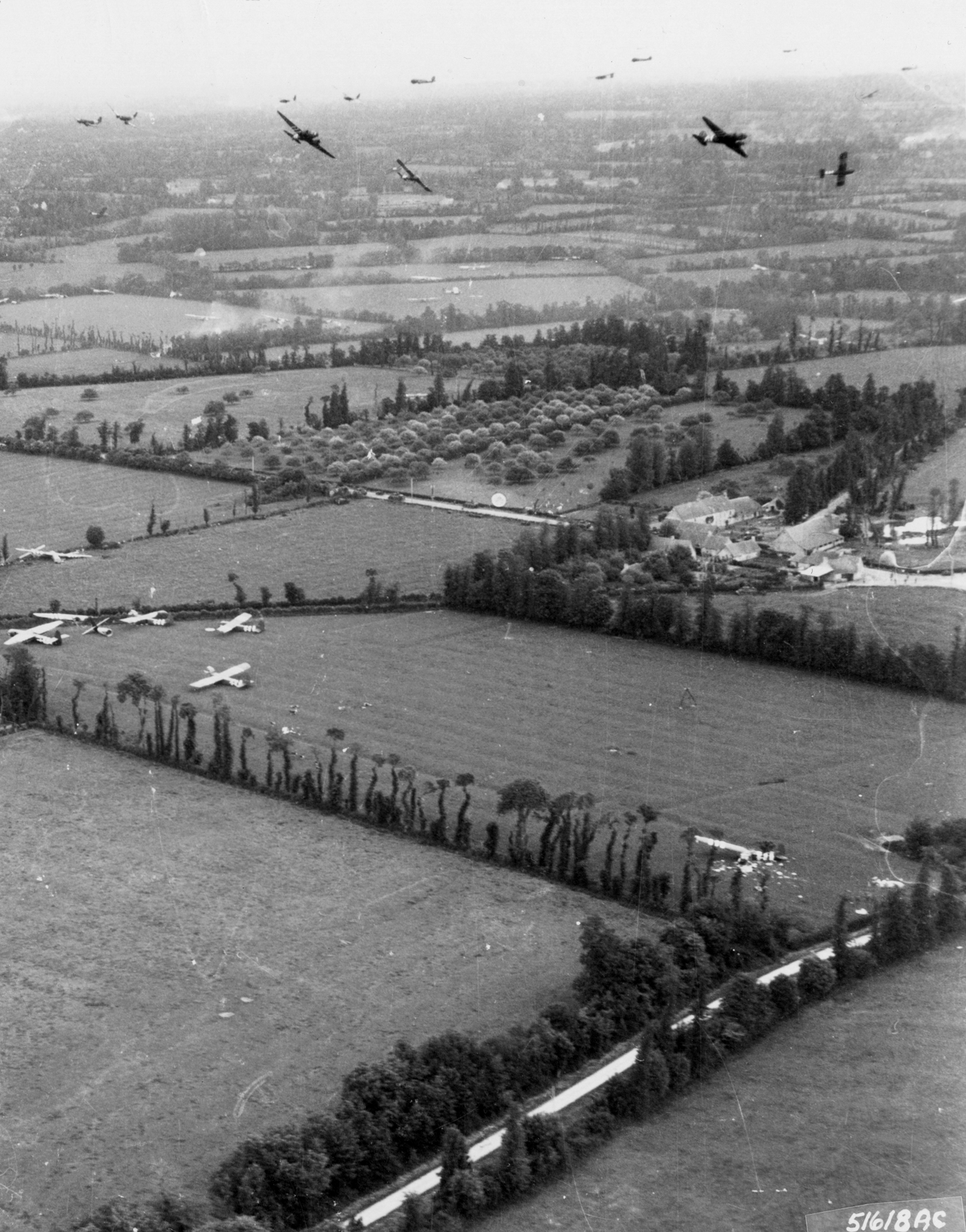
Gliders are delivered to the Cotentin Peninsula during Mission Elmira.

In the center, the 82nd Airborne were able to consolidate their position at Sainte-Mère-Église in part due to the work of First Lieutenant Turner Turnbull and a squad of 43 men, who held off for more than two hours a far larger enemy force that was attempting to retake the crossroads from the north. A task force led by Colonel Edson Raff that included 16 Sherman tanks of the 746th Tank Battalion, four armored cars, and a squad of infantry worked their way up from the beach, but were stopped from reinforcing Sainte-Mère-Église by a line of German defenders 2 miles (3.2 km) south of the town. Reinforcements arrived by glider around 04:00 (Mission Chicago and Mission Detroit), and 21:00 (Mission Keokuk and Mission Elmira), bringing additional troops and heavy equipment. Like the paratroopers, many landed far from their drop zones. Even those that landed on target experienced difficulty, with heavy cargo such as Jeeps shifting during landing, crashing through the wooden fuselage, and in some cases crushing personnel on board. German defenders also took a toll on the glider units, with heavy losses inflicted in the area near Sainte-Mère-Église in particular. Members of the 82nd Airborne who had landed west of the Merderet were widely scattered and surrounded by enemy forces. They quickly realized that they would be unable to achieve their D-day objectives and would have to wait for reinforcements. It took several days for this to happen as the Germans set up defensive positions along the river. For 36 hours, 82nd Airborne were unable to establish radio contact with other units or with Collins aboard his command ship, USS Bayfield.

The 82nd Airborne were finally relieved by the 90th Infantry Division, who began disembarking at 16:00 on D-Day and were all ashore by June 8. The original plan for the 90th had been that they should push north toward the port of Cherbourg, but Collins changed their assignment: they were to cut across the Cotentin Peninsula, isolating the German forces therein and preventing reinforcements from entering the area. Their poor performance led to their being replaced by the more experienced 82nd Airborne and 9th Infantry Division, who reached the west coast of the Cotentin on June 17, cutting off Cherbourg. The 9th Division, joined by the 4th and 79th Infantry Divisions, took control of the peninsula in fierce fighting. Cherbourg fell during the Battle of Cherbourg on June 26, but by this time the Germans had destroyed the port facilities, which were not brought back into full operation until September.

== Result ==
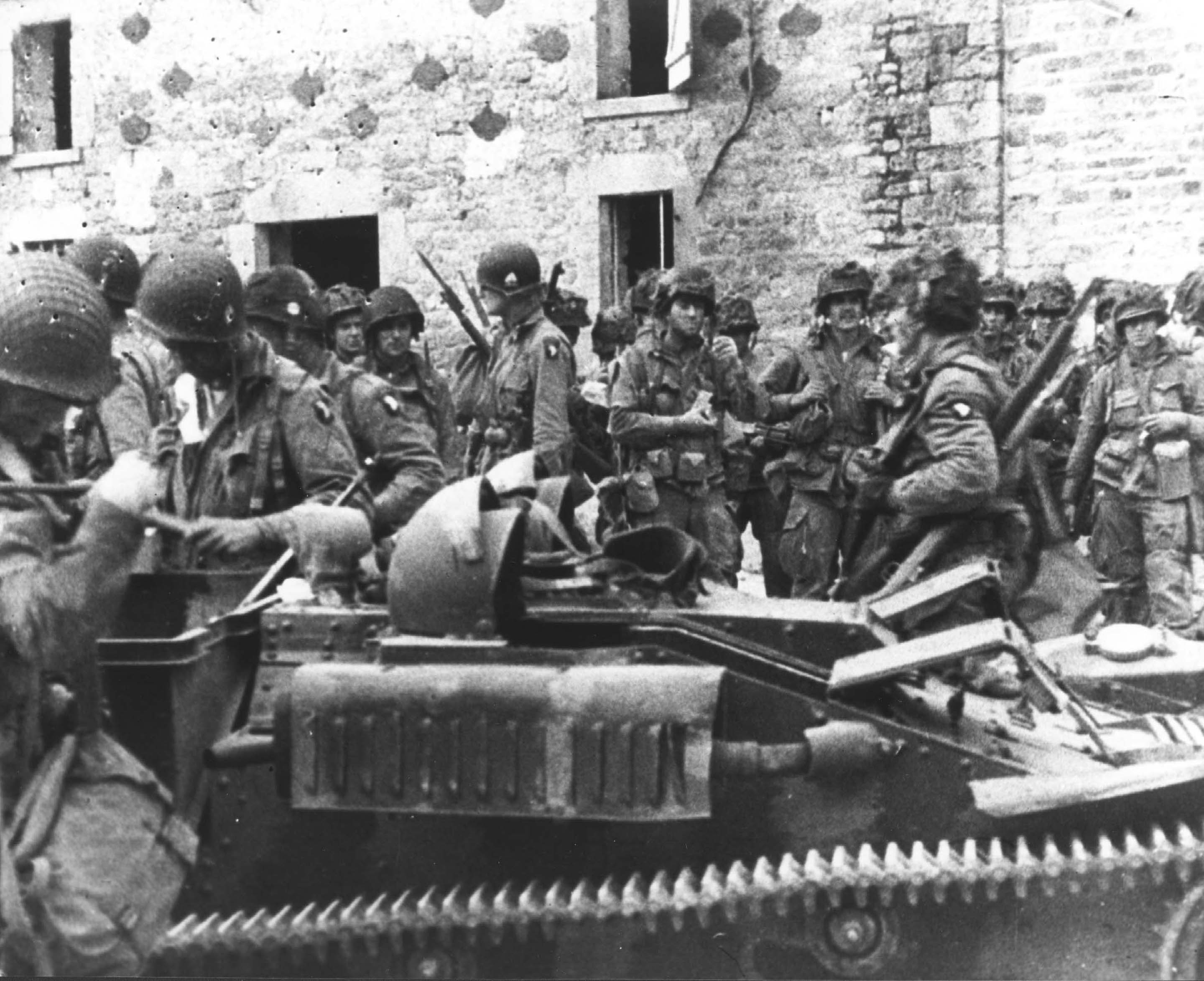
Members of the 101st Airborne Division in the village of St. Marcouf, June 8, 1944

The 4th Infantry Division did not meet all their D-Day objectives at Utah, partly because they had arrived too far to the south. They suffered 197 casualties. Airborne troops arriving by parachute and glider numbered an additional 14,000 men, with 2,500 casualties. Around 700 men were lost in engineering units, the 70th Tank Battalion, and LCTs and other vessels sunk by the enemy. German losses are unknown.

Forces landing on Utah cleared the immediate area in less than an hour, and penetrated 4 miles (6.4 km) inland by the close of D-Day. Within two hours of landing, the 82nd Airborne captured the important crossroads at Sainte-Mère-Église, but they failed to neutralize the line of defenses along the Merderet on D-Day as planned. While many of the airborne forces landed far from their drop zones and were unable to meet all their D-Day objectives, this widespread scattering of forces had the unintended side effect of confusing the German defenders, who were slow to react.

The highly trained 4th Division faced a mediocre German unit composed of conscripts; all the best troops of the 709th Division had been sent to the Eastern Front. The Allies achieved and maintained air superiority, which meant that the Germans were unable to make observations of preparations underway in Britain prior to the invasion and were unable to launch airborne counter assaults on D-Day. Extensive Allied reconnaissance provided the attackers with detailed maps of the defenses and terrain. Unlike neighboring Omaha, the preliminary aerial bombardment was highly effective at Utah. Indecisiveness and an overcomplicated command structure on the part of the German high command was also a factor in the Allied success at Utah and throughout the Normandy campaign.

== Units ==
German	Allied (United States)
91st Infantry Division, commanded by Generalleutnant Wilhelm Falley; 6th Parachute Regiment (attached from the 2nd Parachute Division); Two battalions of the 919th Grenadier Regiment, part of the 709th Static Infantry Division under Generalleutnant Karl-Wilhelm von Schlieben	VII Corps, commanded by Major General J. Lawton Collins; 4th Infantry Division: Major General Raymond O. Barton; 70th Tank Battalion: Lieutenant Colonel John Welborn; 90th Infantry Division: Brigadier General Jay W. MacKelvie; 4th Cavalry Regiment: Colonel Joseph Tully; 82nd Airborne Division: Major General Matthew Ridgway; 101st Airborne Division: Major General Maxwell D. Taylor

== Maps ==
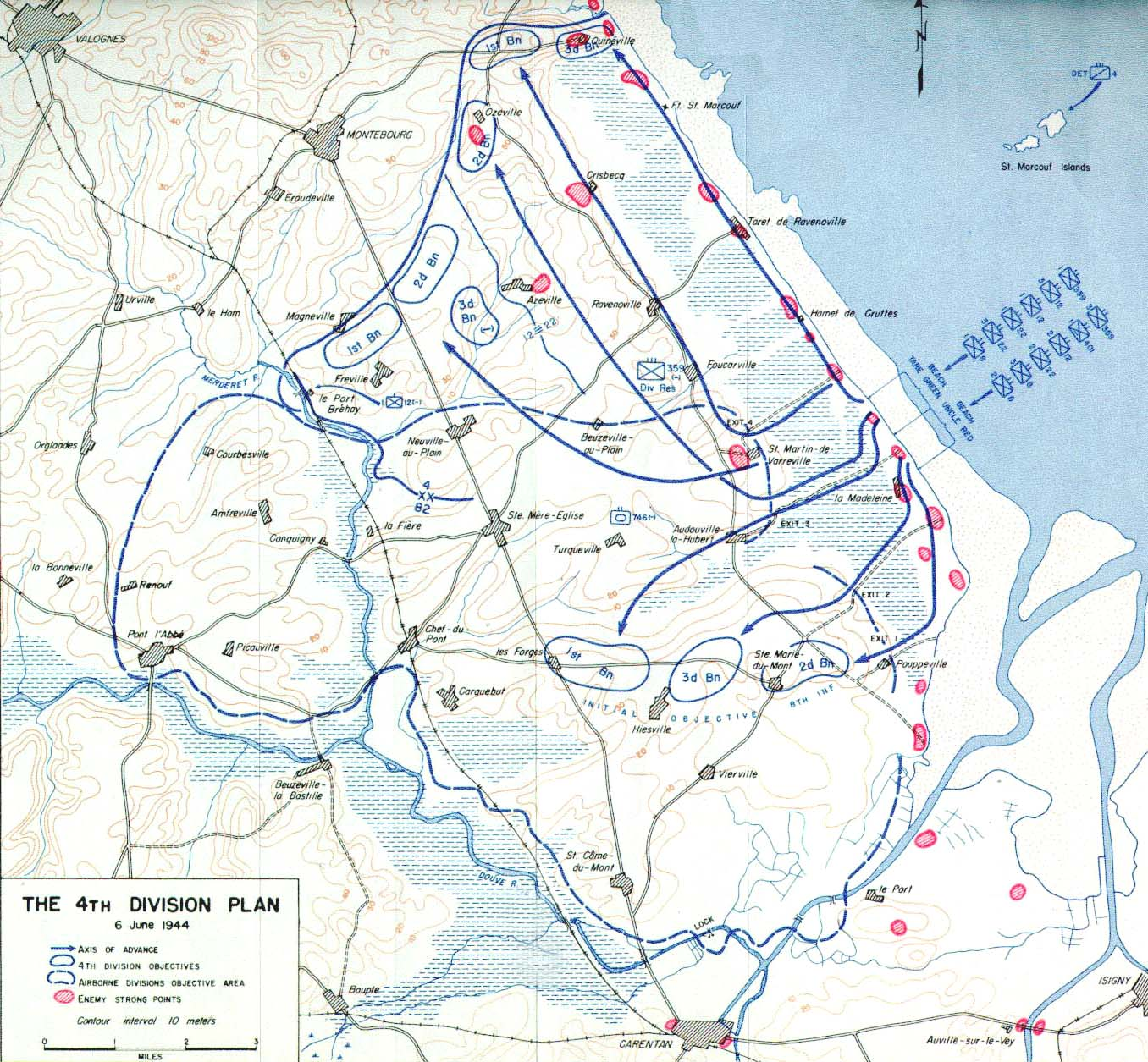
Plan for US 4th Infantry Division on D-Day

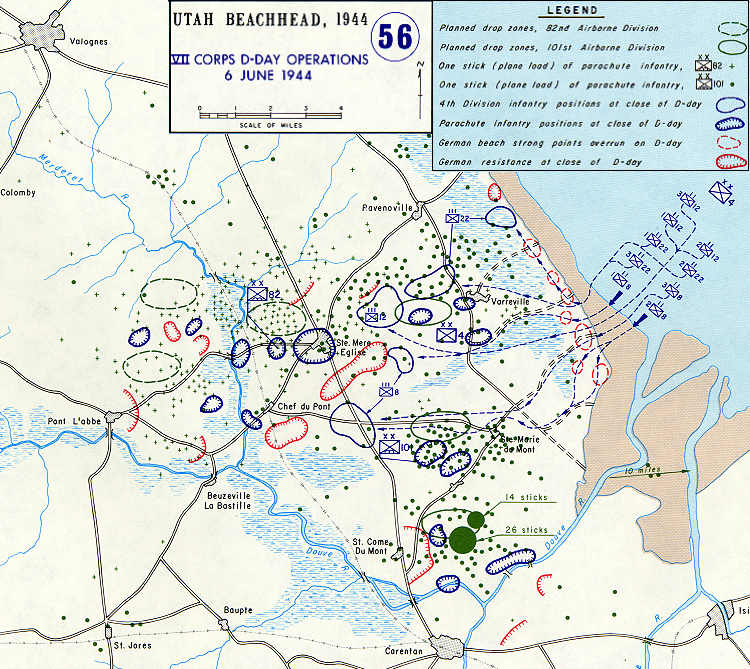
Positions at close of D-Day. Brown color: beach.

== See also ==
- American airborne landings in Normandy
- Exercise Tiger
- Gold Beach
- Juno Beach

== Sources ==
- Balkoski, Joseph (2005). Utah Beach: The Amphibious Landing and Airborne Operations on D-Day, June 6, 1944. Mechanicsburg, PA: Stackpole Books. ISBN 0-8117-0144-1.
- Beevor, Antony (2009). D-Day: The Battle for Normandy. New York; Toronto: Viking. ISBN 978-0-670-02119-2.
- Buckingham, William F. (2004). D-Day: The First 72 Hours. Stroad, Gloucestershire: Tempus. ISBN 978-0-7524-2842-0.
- Caddick-Adams, Peter (2019). Sand and Steel: A New History of D-Day. London: Hutchinson. ISBN 978-1-84794-8-281.
- Ford, Ken; Zaloga, Steven J (2009). Overlord: The D-Day Landings. Oxford; New York: Osprey. ISBN 978-1-84603-424-4.
- Gilbert, Martin (1989). The Second World War: A Complete History. New York: H. Holt. ISBN 978-0-8050-1788-5.
- Lee, Demorris A. (June 6, 2008). "For Largo Man, D-Day Is Like Yesterday". St. Petersburg Times. Archived from the original on May 24, 2014.
- Margaritis, Peter (2019). Countdown to D-Day: The German Perspective. Oxford, UK & PA, USA: Casemate. ISBN 978-1-61200-769-4.
- Tucker-Jones, Anthony (2019). D-Day 1944: The Making of Victory. Gloucestershire, England: The History Press. ISBN 978-0-7509-8803-2.
- Whitmarsh, Andrew (2009). D-Day in Photographs. Stroud: History Press. ISBN 978-0-7524-5095-7.
- Wilmot, Chester (1997) [1952]. The Struggle for Europe. Ware, Hertfordshire: Wordsworth Editions. ISBN 1-85326-677-9.
