= List of ships in Utah Bombardment Group =

Ships supporting the 1944 Normandy landings

Below is a list of ships responsible for bombarding targets at Utah Beach as part of the Normandy landings on June 6, 1944, the opening day of Operation Overlord. This force, code-named "Bombardment Group A", and commanded by Rear Admiral Morton Deyo, was a group of eighteen warships assigned to support the amphibious landings on Utah Beach on June 6, 1944 ("D-Day"); this was the opening day of Operation Overlord, the Allied operation that launched the successful invasion of German-occupied western Europe during World War II.

It was part of US Navy Force U, which consisted of 865 ships under Rear Admiral Don P. Moon. This was in turn part of the Western Naval Task Force, under Admiral Alan G Kirk.

US Navy Force U Bombardment Group
Name	Type	National service	Captain
Nevada	Battleship	US Navy	Captain P. M. Rhea
Erebus	Monitor	Royal Navy	Captain J. S. Colquhoun
Hawkins	Heavy cruiser	Royal Navy	Captain J. W. Josselyn
Quincy	Heavy cruiser	US Navy	Captain E. M. Senn
Tuscaloosa	Heavy cruiser	US Navy	Captain J. B. Waller; flagship of Rear Admiral Morton Deyo
Black Prince	Light cruiser	Royal Navy	Captain D. M. Lees
Enterprise	Light cruiser	Royal Navy	Captain H. T. Grant
Soemba	Gunboat	Netherlands	Lt. Cmdr. H. H. Propper
Butler	Destroyer	US Navy	Cmdr. M. Matthews
Corry	Destroyer	US Navy	Lt. Cmdr. G. Hoffman
Fitch	Destroyer	US Navy	Cmdr. K. Walpole
Forrest	Destroyer	US Navy	Cmdr. Letts
Gherardi	Destroyer	US Navy	Cmdr. M. Curtin
Herndon	Destroyer	US Navy	Cmdr. G. Moore
Hobson	Destroyer	US Navy	Lieutenant K. Loveland
Shubrick	Destroyer	US Navy	Lt. Cmdr. W. Blenman
Bates	Destroyer escort	US Navy	Lt. Cmdr. H. Wilmerding
Rich	Destroyer escort	US Navy	Lt. Cmdr. E. Michel
Hotham	Frigate	Royal Navy	A/Lt.Cdr. Sydney Ayles
Tyler	Frigate	Royal Navy	Lt. Christopher H. Rankin

== Sources ==
- Balkoski, Joseph (2005). Utah Beach: The Amphibious Landing and Airborne Operations on D-Day, June 6, 1944. Mechanicsburg, PA: Stackpole Books. ISBN 0-8117-0144-1.
- Churchill, Winston (1951) [1948]. Closing the Ring. The Second World War. Vol. V. Boston: Houghton Mifflin. OCLC 396150.
