= Mission Chicago =

Combat assault in the American airborne landings in Normandy (WWII)

Mission Chicago was a pre-dawn glider-borne combat assault in the American airborne landings in Normandy, made by elements of the 101st Airborne Division on the early morning of June 6, 1944 during the Normandy landings of World War II. It was part of Operation Neptune, the assault portion of the Allied invasion of Normandy, codenamed Operation Overlord. Originally slated to be the main assault for the 101st Airborne Division, the glider operation instead became the first reinforcement mission after the main parachute combat assault, Mission Albany. Because the area of responsibility for the division was in close proximity to Utah Beach, the use of glider reinforcement was limited in scale, with most division support units transported by sea.

== Overview ==
The 101st Airborne Division's objectives were to secure the four causeway exits behind Utah Beach, destroy a German coastal artillery battery at Saint-Martin-de-Varreville, capture buildings nearby at Mezières believed used as barracks and a command post for the artillery battery, capture the Douve River lock at la Barquette (opposite Carentan), capture two footbridges spanning the Douve River at la Porte opposite Brevands, destroy the highway bridges over the Douve at Sainte-Come-du-Mont, and secure the Douve River valley.

In the process units would also disrupt German communications, establish roadblocks to hamper the movement of German reinforcements, establish a defensive line between the beachhead and Valognes, clear the area of the drop zones to the unit boundary at Les Forges, and link up with the veteran 82nd Airborne Division.

== Mission description ==
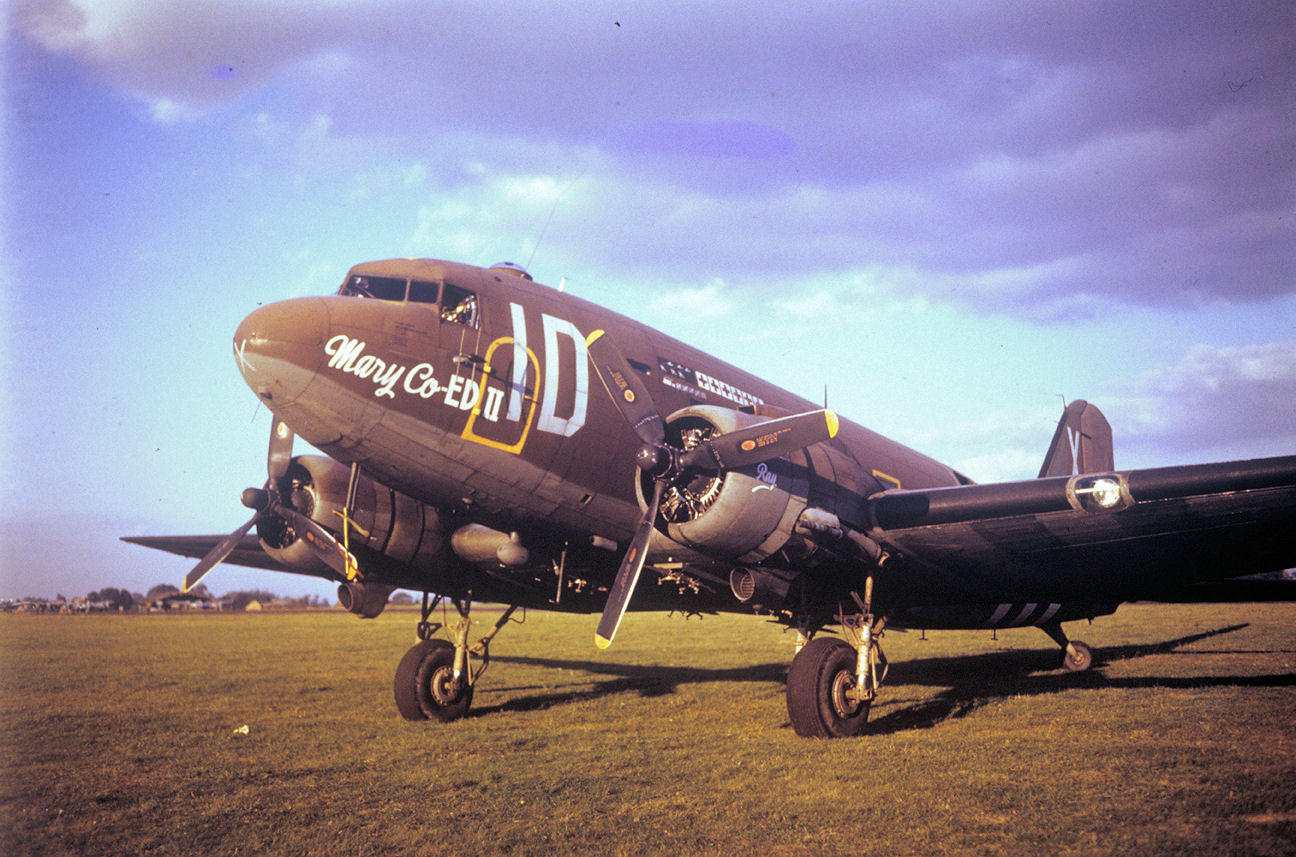
Douglas C-47 of the 74th Troop Carrier Squadron, 434th TCG.

Mission Chicago was the 27th serial of the airborne assault, and was flown by the troop carrier C-47 Skytrains of the 434th Troop Carrier Group at RAF Aldermaston. 52 aircraft acted as tugs for an equal number of CG-4A Waco gliders carrying 155 troops, a Clark CA1 bulldozer, sixteen 57-mm (6-pounder) antitank guns, and 25 small vehicles. 2.5 tons of ammunition and 11 tons of equipment were also transported, including an SCR-499 radio set for the division headquarters command post.

Chicago was primarily an artillery reinforcement mission. Aboard 44 gliders were Batteries A and B of the 81st Airborne Antiaircraft Battalion - both batteries were antitank batteries and equipped with the 57-mm (6-pounder) antitank guns. The other 8 gliders carried small elements of the 326th Airborne Engineer Battalion, the 101st Signal Company, the antitank platoon of the 327th Glider Infantry Regiment (GIR), and a surgical team of the 326th Airborne Medical Company. Also accompanying the glider serial in a last-minute change was the assistant division commander (ADC) of the 101st Airborne Division, Brigadier General Don Pratt, who had been designated to command the seaborne echelon.

The mission had originally been planned for glider release at civil twilight on the evening before the amphibious landings, but to protect the gliders from ground fire the time was changed on May 27 to 04:00 on D-Day, 2 hours before dawn. The designated destination in France was Landing Zone (LZ) E, an area co-located with and slightly overlapping one of the paratroop drop zones, DZ C. The area was chosen as central to the operations of the division and because a BUPS beacon ("Beacon, Ultra Portable S-band") was to be in place there on which the serial commander could guide using the SCR-717 search radars installed in the aircraft of flight leaders.

The landing zone was a triangle-shaped area a mile in width at its mile-long base along the road connecting les Forges (a hamlet south of Sainte-Mère-Église) and Sainte-Marie-du-Mont. The zone was 1.5 miles (2.4 km) in depth and its eastern edge ran through Hiesville, the division command post two miles (3 km) west of Ste. Marie-du-Mont. In addition to its central locality, the fields within the zone were on average twice the length of most others in the vicinity. Many of the fields, however, were bordered by trees 40 feet (12 m) in height and not hedgerows, a fact that did not show up well on aerial reconnaissance photographs.

Air movement table - mission Chicago
| Serial | Airborne Unit | Troop carrier Group | # of C-47s | UK Base | Drop Zone | Drop Zone Time |
|---|---|---|---|---|---|---|
| 27 | Batteries A & B, 81st AAA Bn; Elements 326th Abn Eng Bn; Elements 326th Abn Medic Co | 434th TCG | 52 | RAF Aldermaston | A | 0400 |

== Glider assault ==
The first of 52 aircraft took off at 01:19. Bright moonlight enabled the tugs to assemble in thirteen flights of four aircraft-glider combinations in an "echelon of four to the right" formation. Shortly after assembly the glider carrying the command post radio broke loose from its tug and landed. The radio was retrieved and transported that evening in mission Keokuk, but the accident meant that the 101st Airborne Division would be out of radio contact with other invasion forces until after link-up with the 4th Infantry Division coming off Utah Beach.

The weather along its route had moderated from the dense cloud bank and ground fog that had severely disrupted the parachute drops two hours earlier. Because they were in trail and not in close formation vees, the tugs and gliders were able to penetrate the clouds without losing formation. The columns drew ground fire, however, and one C-47 and its glider went down near Pont l'Abbé on the Douve River, west of the landing zone. Seven transports and several gliders also incurred damage.

The commander of the 434th TCG was guided to LZ E by a "Eureka" transponding radar beacon set up there by the pathfinders (the BUPS AN/UPN-1 beacons had been damaged in landing and were inoperable). Although it had been placed in the wrong section of the LZ, the 'Tee' shape formed by green Holophane marker lights was observed by pilots of the arriving C-47s. At 0354, six minutes early, 49 of the 50 remaining pilots released their gliders at the designated point from an altitude of 450 feet (140 m) MSL. The 50th, wandering out of formation, released its glider south of Carentan.

During the specified 270° left turns after release, most of the Waco glider pilots lost sight of the marker lights. The moon was setting by release time and obscured by scattered clouds so that without reference to the markers the glider pilots no longer recognized the landing zone. Just six landed on the LZ itself and only 15 others in fields within a half mile. A group of ten landed in a field near les Forges. Of the remaining 18, all but one landed in fields to the east within two miles (3 km).

Almost all crash-landed in the smaller fields outside the LZ after overshooting to clear unexpected trees. German ground fire was ineffective in the dark, and even though most gliders struck a tree or ditch, most loads were successfully landed without harm. In one glider Gen. Pratt was killed along with the co-pilot (the aftermath of this incident is fictionalized in the film Saving Private Ryan). Total casualties were 5 dead, 17 injured, and 7 missing.

At dawn the division command post sent out a large patrol to assist the reinforcements in removing their equipment from the crushed gliders (very few were crushed so badly that the equipment could not be removed immediately) and to guide them to Hiesville. Collecting and assembling the equipment was a lengthy process, but at noon the patrol returned with 3 jeeps, 6 AT guns, 115 glider troops, and 35 German prisoners. A USAF history of the airborne landings concluded that Mission Chicago had "succeeded beyond expectation".

== Sources ==
- Warren, Dr. John C. USAF Historical Study 97: Airborne Operations in World War II, European Theater (1956). Air University.
- U.S. Airborne in Cotentin Peninsula
