= Clark CA1 =

Small WWII era bulldozer

Clark airborne bulldozer 1
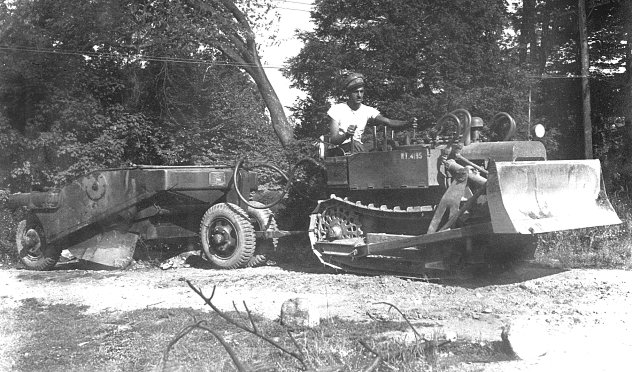
- Clark CA1 towing a Choate CAB-1 Pan scraper to finish an airfield.
- Type: airborne bulldozer
- Manufacturer: Clark Equipment Company
- Production: 1942–1945
- Length: 110 in (9.2 ft)
- Width: 59 in (4.9 ft) (5 ft with blade)
- Height: 59 in (4.9 ft)
- Weight: 5,000 lb (2,268 kg) (with blade)
- Propulsion: steel tracks
- Engine model: 4 cylinder water cooled Waukesha Model FC
- Gross power: 20 drawbar horsepower (15 kW)

The Clark air Crawler model CA-1 widely known as the Clark CA-1 was a small airborne bulldozer designed for improvement of runways in World War II by the United States Armed Forces.

== Design and production ==
In 1942, the United States military created a new engineering unit that would be extremely mobile; this could only be done with light equipment. The military began looking for new bulldozer small and light enough to be flown in the Douglas C-47 and the Waco CG-4A. When the parameters were set the military looked for a company to create such a machine. They were to draw inspiration from the US Forestry Service's "trail tractor" (a small tractor for use in small clearings and fields within the forest).

In 1942, the Clark Machine Company took the contract. Clark initially built 14 operational dozers and conducted extensive tests at their facilities. Once proven, the military ordered 800 more and eventually extended that figure. The War Department worked with Clark Machine over the course of the years 1942 and 1943 ordering many CA-1s by the end of World War 2. It is estimated that there were more than 2,500 produced.

== Operation ==
The Tractor was flown in by either a C-46 or C-47 or transported by a glider, which landed on an unimproved runway or a possible runway. Once dropped off, the engineers used the tractors to construct a paved or improved landing strip. The CA-1 would be used predominantly to tow graders and pan scrapers. This style of construction was fast and relatively efficient which gave the United States a reasonable strategic advantage in the Pacific campaign of World War 2 due to the island hopping tactic that required many new airfields. After the war a new community of people eager to restore these small and light tractor emerged.

More than 1,500 CA-1s were used by the US Army.

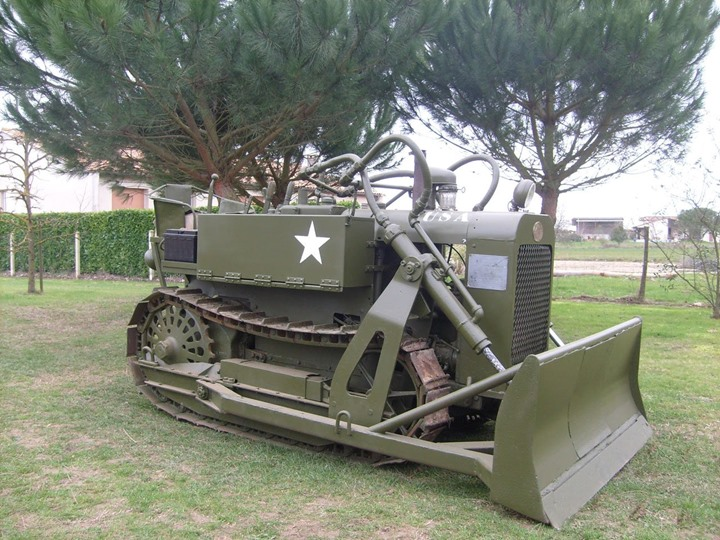
Oldest Bulldozer Clark Airborne CA-1433

== The oldest known collected bulldozer ==
The oldest working bulldozer still in existence is the Clark Airborne CA-1433 Bulldozer. It is the third one to have been produced by Clark Industries for the U.S. Army as stated in the U.S. Army contract data below :

Contract No. W-145-A eng.-511 Tractor Serial No. CA-1431 to CA-143162 (162 vehicles produced) Army Registration No. 953463 to 953624

Having been airlifted during the landings of the Second World War, it is currently in a private collection in France.

Here is the official website of the bulldozer bulldozerclark.eu

== Survivors ==
A Clark CA-1 was restored to running condition in New Zealand in 2023.

The Air Mobility Command Museum in Dover, Delaware has a fully functional Clark Airborne CA-1 tractor on display. This specimen was restored Mr. Darrell Smoker

The National Museum of the United States Airforce has one on display which was restored by the Clark Equipment Co.

There are two surviving examples in museums in the United Kingdom.

Duxford Air Museum houses a Clark CA-1 in its US Hangar.

The Imperial War Museum London also exhibits a Clark CA-1.

There are a small number of Clark CA-1 Airborne Bulldozers in private ownership in the UK.
