= Mission Elmira =

During World War II, Mission Elmira was the landing of a significant part of the 82nd Airborne Division’s glider train in Normandy on the evening of 6 June 1944 as part of Operation Neptune, the assault phase of Operation Overlord.

== Mission composition and purpose ==
Elmira consisted of 176 Douglas C-47 Skytrain troop carrier aircraft acting as glider tugs, 36 Waco CG-4 gliders, and 140 of the larger Airspeed Horsa gliders, divided into one serial of 26 and three serials of 50 tug-glider combinations. One additional C-47, which had returned to base earlier in the day without dropping its stick of paratroopers, accompanied the last flight of the mission. The planned and briefed landing zone for the gliders was LZ W, located two miles (3 km) southeast of Sainte-Mère-Église, but a smaller landing zone had also been put in operation that morning north of the town on Drop Zone O.

Elmira was considered an essential mission, delivering two battalions of glider artillery and 24 howitzers to the 82nd Airborne. It consisted of four serials of aircraft, the first to arrive ten minutes after Mission Keokuck, a similar but much smaller mission to reinforce the 101st Airborne Division. To reduce congestion over the landing zones, two serials of mission Elmira were delayed two hours until just before sunset. These carried both battalions of glider field artillery and their guns. Because the missions were flown on British Double Summer Time, both were daylight missions, with the first wave taking off at 1907 and arriving at 2104, and the second wave taking off at 2037 and arriving at 2255.

== Mission details ==
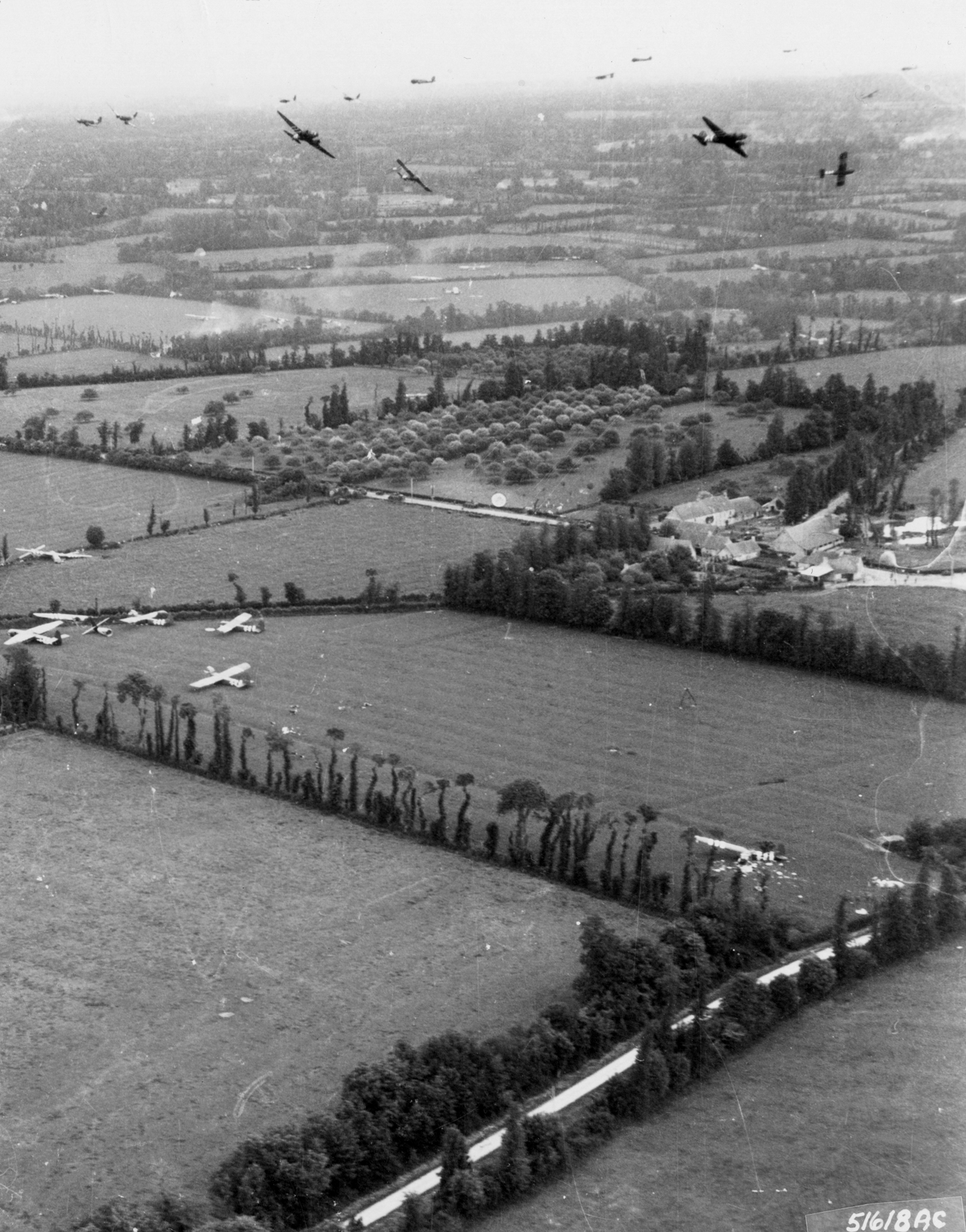
C-47s cut loose their CG-4 gliders over the landing zone.Picture was taken south east of Ste Mere-Eglise showing Landing Zone W at Les Forges, where the N13 highway and Chef-du-Pont - Ste.Marie-du-Mont road intersect.,

The first two serials of 76 tug-glider combinations came under heavy ground fire just before the release point. Two C-47s were shot down after release and half the survivors suffered battle damage. Unknown to the troop carriers, troops of the German 795th Georgian Battalion occupied part of the landing zone, and the "Eureka" transponding radar beacon landing aids had been moved two miles (3 km) to the northwest on Drop Zone/Landing Zone O. The C-47s released their gliders for the original LZ, unaware of the aids on LZ O. Although the 82nd Airborne considered the landings inaccurate because they did not land on LZ O, most came down within 2 miles (3.2 km) of the original LZ. Of the 3 Wacos and 21 Horsa destroyed, most were the result of German mortar and artillery fire after landing.

The second wave of mission Elmira arrived at 2255 just as the terrain was enveloped in shadow, and since no other pathfinder aids were operating, headed for the Eureka beacon on LZ O. Approximately halfway there, it came under the most severe ground fire of the day, since the route to LZ O passed directly over and along the German lines. Despite this, damage was similar to that of the serials that had come in two hours earlier, with three C-47s ditching on the way home. The last two glider serials had mixed accuracy. The first released early and came down near or within German lines, but the second came down on Landing Zone O, except for 5 who followed their briefing orders and landed on LZ W. Even so, virtually all of the personnel of both battalions made their way to the 82nd Airborne positions by morning, and had 15 of their 24 guns in operation by sundown of June 8.

Casualties in mission Elmira were 15 killed, 17 wounded, and 4 missing among the glider pilots; and 33 killed and 124 wounded among the passengers. Strom Thurmond, then a lieutenant colonel in a civil affairs unit was at age 41 credited with being the oldest person attached to the division to go into Normandy with the invasion. He later became the longest-serving senator in United States history.

Air movement table - mission Elmira
Serial	Airborne Unit	Troop carrier Group	# of C-47s	# of gliders	UK Base	Landing Zone	LZ Time
30	Btty C/HQ 80th AAA Bn; 82d Abn Div Arty; 82nd Signal Co	437th TCG	26	8 Waco CG-4; 18 Horsa	RAF Ramsbury, Wiltshire	W	2110
31	82nd Abn Recon Plat; 82nd Signal Co; Div HQ; 307th Abn Medic Co	438th TCG	50	14 Waco; 36 Horsa	RAF Greenham Common, Berkshire	W	2120
32	319th Glid FA Bn; 307th Abn Medic Co; Co A 307th Abn Engr Bn; 82nd Abn Div Arty	436th TCG	50	2 Waco; 48 Horsa	RAF Membury, Berkshire	O	2300
33	320th Glid FA Bn	435th TCG	50	12 Waco; 38 Horsa	RAF Welford, Berkshire	O	2310

.

== Sources ==
- Warren, Dr. John C. USAF Historical Study 97: Airborne Operations in World War II, European Theater (1956). Air University.
- U.S. Airborne in Cotentin Peninsula
