= James M. Gavin =

US Army general (1907–1990)

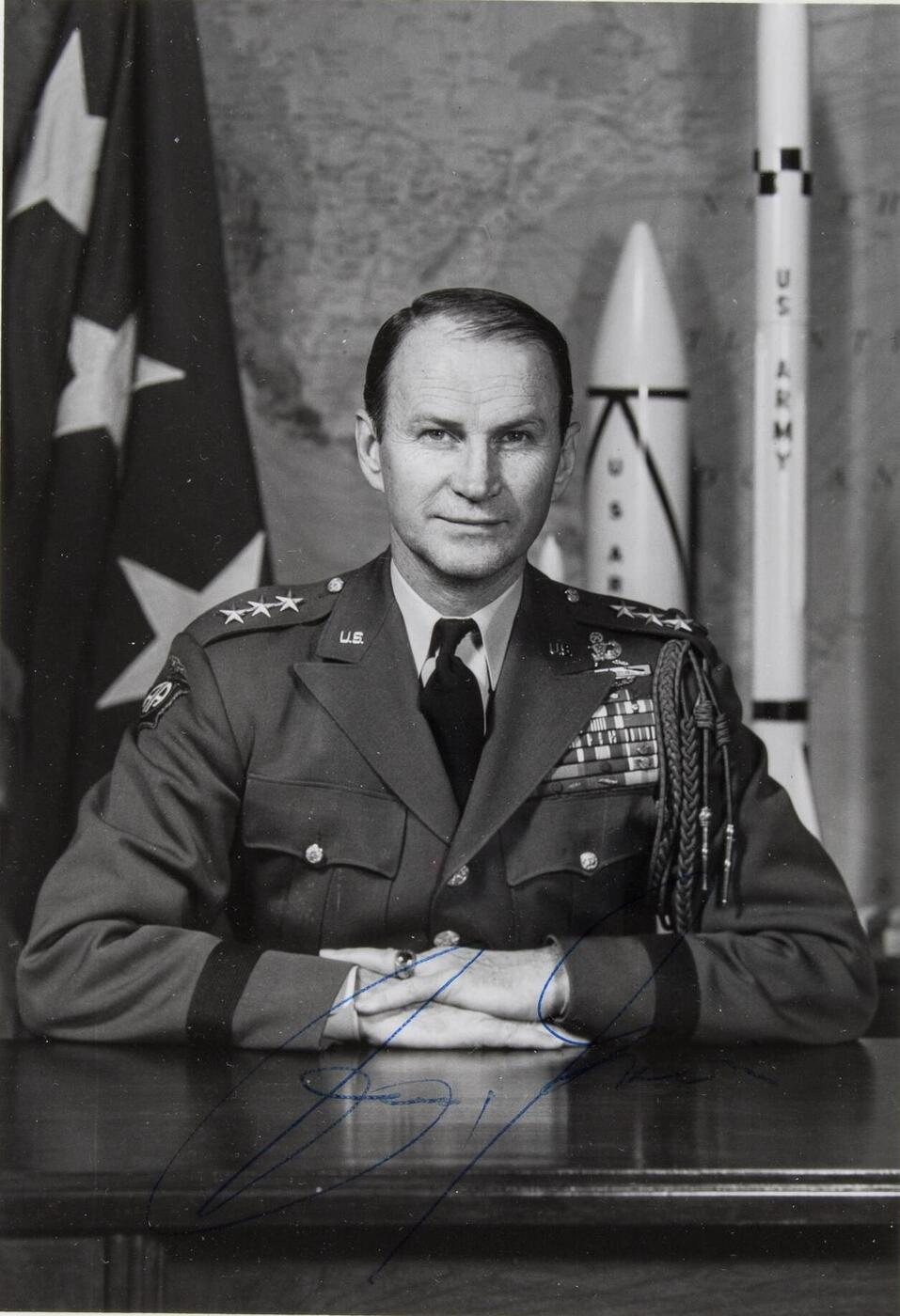
- Official portrait, 1964

United States Ambassador to France
- In office March 21, 1961 – September 26, 1962
- President: John F. Kennedy
- Preceded by: Amory Houghton
- Succeeded by: Charles E. Bohlen

Personal details
- Born: James Maurice Gavin; March 22, 1907 New York City, United States
- Died: February 23, 1990 (aged 82) Baltimore, Maryland, United States
- Resting place: West Point Cemetery, New York, United States
- Spouses: Irma Baulsir (m. 1929; div. 1947) (Note: "Gavin and Irma Baulsir divorced sometime between the end of the war in 1945 and 1948 when he married Jean Duncan") Jean Emert Duncan (m. 1948)
- Children: 5
- Nickname(s): "The Jumping General" "Slim Jim" "Jumpin' Jim"

Military service
- Allegiance: United States
- Branch/service: United States Army
- Years of service: 1924–1958
- Rank: Lieutenant General
- Unit: Infantry Branch
- Commands: 505th Parachute Infantry Regiment; 82nd Airborne Division; VII Corps
- Battles/wars: World War II: Operation Husky; Operation Avalanche; Operation Overlord; Operation Market Garden; Battle of the Bulge
- Awards: Distinguished Service Cross (2); Distinguished Service Medal; Silver Star (2); Bronze Star Medal; Purple Heart; Distinguished Service Order (United Kingdom); Legion of Honour (France)
- Service number: 0-17676

James Maurice Gavin (March 22, 1907 – February 23, 1990), sometimes called "Jumpin' Jim" and "the jumping general", was a senior United States Army officer, with the rank of lieutenant general, who was the third Commanding General (CG) of the 82nd Airborne Division during World War II. During the war, he was often referred to as "The Jumping General" because of his practice of taking part in combat jumps with the paratroopers under his command; he was the only American general officer to make four combat jumps in the war.

Gavin was the youngest major general to command an American division in World War II, being only 37 upon promotion, and the youngest lieutenant general after the war, in March 1955. He was awarded two Distinguished Service Crosses and several other decorations for his service in the war. During combat, he was known for his habit of carrying an M1 rifle, typically carried by enlisted U.S. infantry soldiers, instead of the M1 carbine, which officers customarily carried.

Gavin also worked against segregation in the U.S. Army. After the war, Gavin served as United States Ambassador to France from 1961 to 1962.

== Early life ==
Gavin was born in Brooklyn, New York, on 22 March 1907. His precise ancestry is unclear. His mother may have been an Irish immigrant, Katherine Ryan, and his father James Nally (also of Irish heritage), although official documentation lists Thomas Ryan as his father; possibly in order to make the birth legitimate. The birth certificate lists his name as James Nally Ryan, although Nally was crossed out. When he was about two years old, he was placed in the Convent of Mercy orphanage in Brooklyn, where he remained until he was adopted in 1909 by Martin and Mary Gavin from Mount Carmel, Pennsylvania, and given the name James Maurice Gavin.

Gavin took his first job as a newspaper delivery boy at the age of 10. By the age of 11, he had two routes and was an agent for three out-of-town papers. During this time, he enjoyed following articles about World War I. In the eighth grade, he moved on from the paper job and started working at a barbershop. There he listened to the stories of the old miners. This led him to realize he did not want to be a miner. In school, he learned about the Civil War. From that point on, he decided to study everything he could about the subject. He was amazed at what he discovered and decided if he wanted to learn this "magic" of controlling thousands of troops, from miles away, he would have to continue his education at the United States Military Academy (USMA) at West Point, New York.

His adoptive father was a hard-working coal miner, but the family still had trouble making ends meet. Gavin quit school after eighth grade and became a full-time clerk at a shoe store for $12.50 a week. His next stint was as a manager for Jewel Oil Company. A combination of restlessness and limited future opportunities in his hometown caused Gavin to run away from home. In March 1924, on his 17th birthday, he took the night train to New York. The first thing he did upon arriving was to send a telegram to his parents saying everything was all right to prevent them from reporting him missing to the police. After that, he started looking for a job.

== Military career ==
=== Enlistment and West Point ===
At the end of March 1924, aged just 17, Gavin spoke to a sergeant in the United States Army. Since he was under 18, he needed parental consent to enlist. Knowing that his adoptive parents would not consent, Gavin told the recruiter he was an orphan. The recruiter took him and a few other underage boys, who were orphans, to a lawyer who declared himself their guardian and signed the parental consent paperwork. On 1 April 1924, Gavin was sworn into the U.S. Army. He later wrote about this period:

I couldn't wait to join up and I held up my right hand in the Whitehall building on April 1, 1924. I have always remembered the name of the officer who swore me in because it was the same as a Civil War general,—Captain Buckner. He was the first captain of the U.S. Army, in uniform, too, that I had ever seen, and I was impressed.

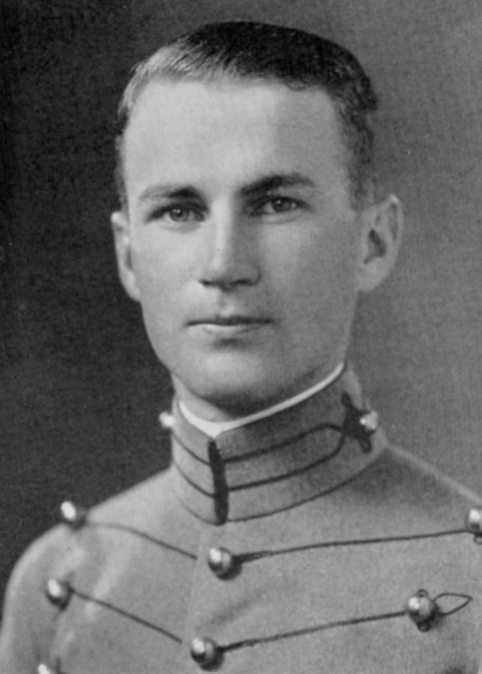
As a West Point cadet

He was first stationed in Panama. His basic training was performed on the job in his unit, the U.S. Coast Artillery at Fort Sherman. He served as a crewmember of a 155 mm gun, under the command of Sergeant McCarthy, who described him as "fine". Another person he looked up to was his first sergeant, an American Indian named "Chief" Williams.

Gavin spent his spare time reading books from the library, notably Great Captains and a biography of Hannibal. He had been forced to quit school in seventh grade in order to help support his family, and acutely felt his lack of education. In addition, he made excursions in the region, trying to satisfy his boundless curiosity about everything. First Sergeant Williams recognized Gavin's potential and made him his assistant; Gavin was promoted to corporal six months later.

He wished to advance in the army, and on Williams's advice, applied to a local army school, from which the best graduates got the chance to attend the USMA at West Point. Gavin passed the physical examinations and was assigned with a dozen other men to a school in Corozal, which was a small army depot in the Canal Zone. He started school on 1 September 1924. In order to prepare for the entrance exams into West Point, Gavin was tutored by another mentor, Lieutenant Percy Black, from 8 o'clock in the morning until noon on algebra, geometry, English, and history. He passed the exams and was allowed to apply to West Point. He wrote, "I have always been grateful to Lieutenant Black for his insistence and have felt that this was what enabled me to pass."

Gavin arrived at West Point in the summer of 1925, three months after his 18th birthday and 14 months after enlistment. On the application forms, he indicated his age as 21 (instead of 18) to hide the fact that he had not been old enough to join the army when he did. Since Gavin missed the basic education that was needed to understand the lessons, he rose at 4:30 every morning and read his books in the bathroom, the only place with enough light to read. After four years of hard work, he graduated in June 1929, 185th out of a class of 299. In the 1929 edition of the West Point yearbook, Howitzer, he was mentioned as a boxer and as the cadet who already had been a soldier. After his graduation and his commissioning as a second lieutenant, he married Irma Baulsir on 5 September 1929.

=== Pre-war career ===
Gavin was posted to Camp Harry J. Jones near Douglas, Arizona, on the U.S.–Mexican border. This camp housed the 25th Infantry Regiment (one of the entirely African-American Buffalo Soldier regiments). He stayed in this posting for three years.

Afterward, Gavin attended the United States Army Infantry School at Fort Benning, Georgia. This school was managed by Colonel George C. Marshall, who had brought Joseph Stilwell with him to lead the Tactics department. Marshall and Stillwell, both of whom were distinguished veterans of World War I, taught their students not to rely on lengthy written orders, but rather to give rough guidelines for the commanders in the field to execute as they saw fit, and to let the field commanders do the actual tactical thinking; this was contrary to all other education in the U.S. Army thus far. Of Stilwell and his methods, Gavin wrote, "He was a superb officer in that position [head of tactics], hard and tough worker, and he demanded much, always insisting that anything you ask the troops to do, you must be able to do yourself."

The time spent at Fort Benning was a happy time for Gavin, but his marriage with Irma Baulsir was not going well. She had moved with him to Fort Benning, and lived in a town nearby. On 23 December 1932, they drove to Baulsir's parents in Washington, D.C., to celebrate Christmas together. Irma decided she was happier there and remained with her parents. In February 1933, Irma became pregnant. Their daughter, Gavin's first child, Barbara, was born while Gavin was away from Fort Sill on a hunting trip. "She was very unhappy with me, as was her mother", Gavin later wrote. Irma remained in Washington during most of their marriage, which ended in divorce upon his return from the war.

In 1933, Gavin, who had no desire to become an instructor for new recruits, was posted to the 28th and 29th Infantry Regiment at Fort Sill, Oklahoma, under the command of then-Lieutenant Colonel (later Lieutenant General) Lesley J. McNair. He spent most of his free time in, as he called it, the "excellent library" of this fort, while the other soldiers spent most of their time partying, shooting, and playing polo. One author in particular impressed Gavin: J. F. C. Fuller. Gavin said about him: "[He] saw clearly the implications of machines, weapons, gasoline, oil, tanks, and airplanes. I read with avidity all of his writings."

In 1936, Gavin was posted to the Philippines. While there, he became very concerned about the US's ability to counter possible Japanese plans for expansion. The 20,000 soldiers stationed there were badly equipped. In the book Paratrooper: The Life of Gen. James M. Gavin, he is quoted as saying, "Our weapons and equipment were no better than those used in World War I". After a year and a half in the Philippines, he returned to Washington with his family and served with the 3rd Infantry Division in the Vancouver Barracks. Gavin was promoted to captain and held his first command position as commanding officer of K Company of the 7th Infantry Regiment.

While stationed at Fort Ord, California, he received an injury to his right eye during a sports match. Gavin feared that this would end his military career, and he visited a physician in Monterey, California. The physician diagnosed a retinal detachment and recommended an eye patch for 90 days. Gavin decided to rely on his eye healing by itself to hide the injury. Gavin returned to West Point as an instructor of tactics during the 1940—1941 school year.

=== World War II ===
==== Constructing an airborne army ====
Gavin began training at the new Parachute School at Fort Benning in August 1941. After graduating in August, he served in an experimental unit. His first command was as a captain and the commanding officer of C Company of the newly established 503rd Parachute Infantry Battalion.

Gavin's friends William T. Ryder, commander of airborne training, and William P. Yarborough, communications officer of the Provisional Airborne Group, convinced Colonel William C. Lee to let Gavin develop the tactics and basic rules of airborne combat. Lee followed up on this recommendation and made Gavin his operations and training officer (S-3). On 16 October 1941, Gavin was promoted to major.

One of Gavin's first priorities was determining how airborne troops could be used most effectively. His first action was writing FM 31-30: Tactics and Technique of Air-Borne Troops. He used information about Soviet and German experiences with paratroopers and glider troops and also used his own experience in tactics and warfare. The manual contained information about tactics, but also about the organization of the paratroopers, what kind of operations they could execute, and what they would need to execute their task effectively. Later, when Gavin was asked what made his career take off so fast, he would answer, "I wrote the book".

In February 1942, shortly after the United States entered World War II, Gavin took a condensed course at the US Army Command and General Staff College at Fort Leavenworth, Kansas, which qualified him to serve on the staff of a division. He returned to the Provisional Airborne Group and was tasked with building up an airborne division. In the spring of 1942, Gavin and Lee went to Army Headquarters in Washington, D.C., to discuss the order of battle for the first US airborne division. The 82nd Infantry Division, then stationed at Camp Claiborne, Louisiana, and commanded by Major General Omar Bradley, was selected to be converted into the first American airborne division and subsequently became the 82nd Airborne Division. Command of the 82nd went to Major General Matthew Ridgway. Lieutenant General Lesley J. McNair's influence led to the division's initial composition of two glider infantry regiments and one parachute infantry regiment, with an organic parachute and glider artillery and other support units.

In August 1942, Gavin became the commanding officer of the 505th Parachute Infantry Regiment (PIR) at Fort Benning which had been activated shortly before on 6 July. He was, aged just 35, promoted to colonel shortly thereafter. Gavin built this regiment from the ground up. He led his troops on long marches and realistic training sessions, creating the training missions himself and leading the marches personally. He also placed great value on having his officers "the first out of the airplane door and the last in the chow line". This practice has continued to and with present-day US airborne units. After months of training, Gavin had the regiment tested one last time:

As we neared our time to leave, on the way to war, I had an exercise that required them to leave our barracks area at 7:00 P.M. and march all night to an area near the town of Cottonwood, Alabama, a march about 23 miles. There we maneuvered all day and in effect, we seized and held an airhead. We broke up the exercise at about 8:00 P.M. and started the troopers back by another route through dense pine forest, by way of backwoods roads. About 11:00 P.M., we went into bivouac. After about one hour's sleep, the troopers were awakened to resume the march. In 36 hours the regiment had marched well over 50 miles, maneuvered and seized an airhead, and defended it from counterattack while carrying full combat loads and living off reserve rations.

==== Preparations for combat ====
In February 1943, the 82nd Airborne Division, commanded by Major General Matthew Ridgway and consisting of the 325th and 326th Glider Infantry Regiments and the 504th Parachute Infantry Regiment, along with various units in support, was selected to participate in the Allied invasion of Sicily, codenamed Operation Husky. Not enough gliders were available to have both glider regiments take part in the landings, however, so the 326th Glider Infantry Regiment was relieved from assignment to the 82nd and replaced by Gavin's 505th Parachute Infantry Regiment, which arrived at Fort Bragg on 12 February.

Gavin arranged a last regimental-sized jump for training and demonstration purposes before the division was shipped to North Africa. On 10 April 1943, Ridgway explained what their next mission would be: Operation Husky, the Allied invasion of Sicily. Gavin's regiment would be the first ever in the history of the United States Army to make a regimental-sized airborne landing. He declared, "It is exciting and stimulating that the first regimental parachute operation in the history of our army is to be taken by the 505. It is going to be very tough to do well but if we fail it will not be through lack of effort. I know the regiment will fight to the last man. They will fight as American troops have never fought before." On 29 April 1943, Gavin left the harbor of New York on board the SS Monterey, arriving in Casablanca on 10 May 1943. Lieutenant General George Patton, the U.S. Seventh Army commander, suggested performing the invasion at night, but Ridgway and Gavin disagreed because they had not practiced night jumps. After mounting casualties during practice jumps because of the troopers landing on the hard and rocky ground of the Moroccan desert, Gavin canceled all practice jumps until the invasion.

The regiment was transported to Kairouan in Tunisia, and on 9 July at 10:00 am they entered the planes that would take them to Sicily. Their mission was to land 24 hours before the planned day/time of major combat initiation ("D-Day") to the north and east of Gela and take and hold the surrounding area to split the German line of supply and disrupt their communications.

==== Operation Husky ====
A soldier informed Gavin that the windspeed at the landing site was 56 km/h (about 34 miles per hour). During the planning phase, 24 km/h (about 14.5 miles per hour) had been assumed. After one hour of flying, the plane crew could see the bombardment of the invasion beaches. Gavin ordered his men to prepare for the jump, and a few minutes later was the first paratrooper to jump from the plane. Due to the higher-than-expected windspeed, he sprained his ankle while landing. After assembling a group of 20 men, his S-3, Major Benjamin H. Vandervoort, and his S-1, Captain Ireland, he realized that they had drifted off course and were miles from the intended landing areas. He could see signs of combat twenty miles onward; he gathered his men and headed towards the combat zone.

With a small band of between eight and twenty paratroopers of the 505th, Gavin began to march toward the sound of the guns. "He had no idea where his regiment was and only a vague idea as to exactly where he was. We walked all night," said Major Vandervoort. The paratroopers did not pose a real threat as a fighting force, but their guerrilla tactics were nevertheless very effective. They aggressively took on enemy forces, leaving the impression of a much larger force. At one point on the morning of July 10, Gavin's tiny band encountered a 35-man Italian anti-paratroop patrol. An intense firefight ensued, and the Italians were driven back. Several paratroopers were wounded before Gavin and his men were able to gradually disengage. Gavin was the last man to withdraw. "We were sweaty, tired, and distressed at having to leave [our] wounded behind," said Vandervoort. "The colonel looked over his paltry six-man command and said, 'This is a hell of a place for a regimental commander to be.'"

At about 8:30 a.m. on 11 July, as Gavin was headed west along Route 115 in the direction of Gela, he began rounding up scattered groups of 505th paratroopers and infantrymen of the 45th Infantry Division and successfully attacked a ridge that overlooked a road junction at the east end of the Acate Valley. It was called Biazzo Ridge. Gavin established hasty defenses on the ridge, overlooking the road junction, Ponte Dirillo, and the Acate River valley. Although he had no tanks or artillery to support him, he immediately appreciated the importance of holding the ridge as the only Allied force between the Germans and their unhindered exploitation of the exposed left flank of the 45th Division and the thinly held right flank of the 1st Infantry Division. Against Gavin, that day was the entire eastern task force of the Hermann Göring Division: at least 700 infantry, an armored artillery battalion, and a company of Tiger tanks.

The German objective was nothing less than counterattacking and throwing the 1st and 45th Divisions back into the sea. Although the attacks of July 10 had failed, those launched the next day posed a dire threat to the still tenuous 45th Division beachhead. For some inexplicable reason, the Germans failed to act aggressively against Gavin's outgunned and outmatched force. Even so, that afternoon, a panzer force attacked Biazzo Ridge. Gavin made it clear to his men, "We're staying on this goddamned ridge – no matter what happens."

The defenders of Biazzo Ridge managed to capture two 75mm pack howitzers, which they turned into direct-fire weapons to defend the ridge. One managed to knock out one of the attacking Tiger tanks. By early evening, the situation had turned grim when six American M4 Sherman tanks suddenly appeared, eliciting cheers from the weary paratroopers, who had been joined by others, including some airborne engineers, infantry, clerks, cooks, and truck drivers. With this scratch force and the Shermans, Gavin counterattacked and in so doing deterred the Germans from pressing their considerable advantage. The battle ended with the Americans still in control of Biazzo Ridge. For his feats of valor that day, Colonel Gavin was later awarded the Distinguished Service Cross.

On 9 December 1943, Gavin was promoted to brigadier general and became the assistant division commander of the 82nd Airborne Division. Being only 36 years old at the time, he was one of the youngest Army officers to become a general in World War II. The 82nd Airborne moved to England during the early months of 1944.

==== D-Day and Mission Boston ====
Gavin was part of Mission Boston on D-Day. This was a parachute combat assault conducted at night by the US 82nd Airborne Division on June 6, 1944, as part of the American airborne landings in Normandy. The intended objective was to secure an area of roughly 10 square miles (26 km^{2}) on either side of the Merderet River. They were to capture the town of Sainte-Mère-Église, a crucial communications crossroad behind Utah Beach, and to block the approaches into the area from the west and southwest. They were to seize causeways and bridges over the Merderet at La Fière and Chef-du-Pont, destroy the highway bridge over the Douve River at Pont l'Abbé (now Étienville), and secure the area west of Sainte-Mère-Église to establish a defensive line between Gourbesville and Renouf. Gavin was to describe the operation as having two interrelated challenges – it had to be 'planned and staged with one eye on deception and one on the assault'.

To complete its assignments, the 82nd Airborne Division was divided into three forces. Gavin commanded Force A (parachute): the three parachute infantry regiments and support detachments. The drops were scattered by bad weather and German antiaircraft fire over an area three to four times larger than planned; ironically, this gave the Germans the impression of a much larger force. Two regiments of the division were given the mission of blocking approaches west of the Merderet River, but most of their troops missed their drop zones entirely. The 505th Parachute Infantry Regiment jumped accurately and captured its objective, the town of Sainte-Mère-Église, which proved essential to the success of the division.

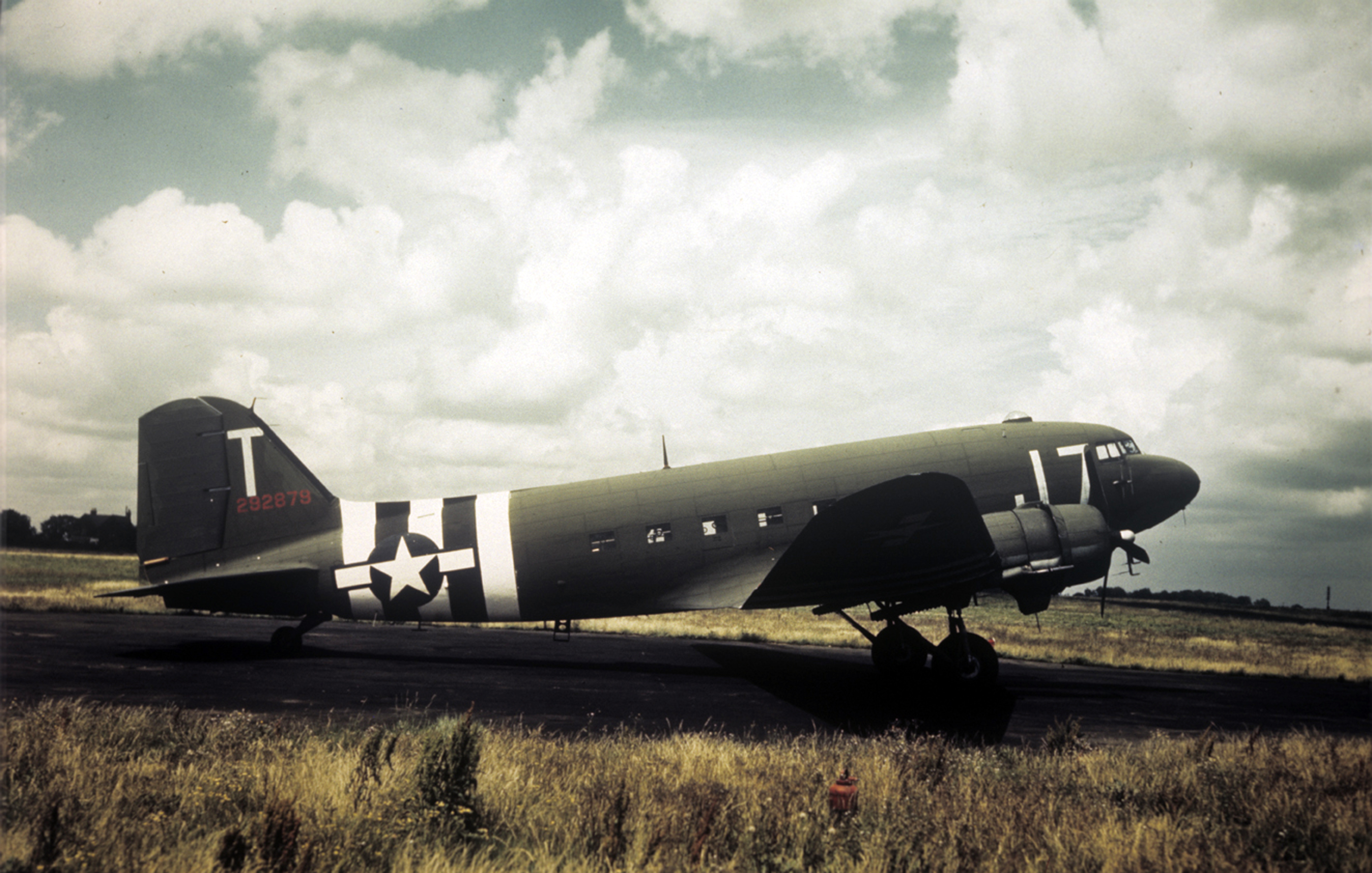
C-47 of the 303d TCS/442d TCG in invasion markings. The 442nd TCG carried the 1st Battalion 507th PIR on D-Day.

The 1st Battalion captured bridges over the Merderet at Manoir de la Fière and Chef-du-Pont. Gavin returned from Chef-du-Pont and withdrew all but a platoon to beef up the defense at Manoir de la Fière. About 2.2 miles west of Sainte-Mère-Église and 175 yards east of La Fière Bridge, on Route D15, a historical marker indicates the supposed location of Gavin's foxhole.

==== Operation Market Garden ====
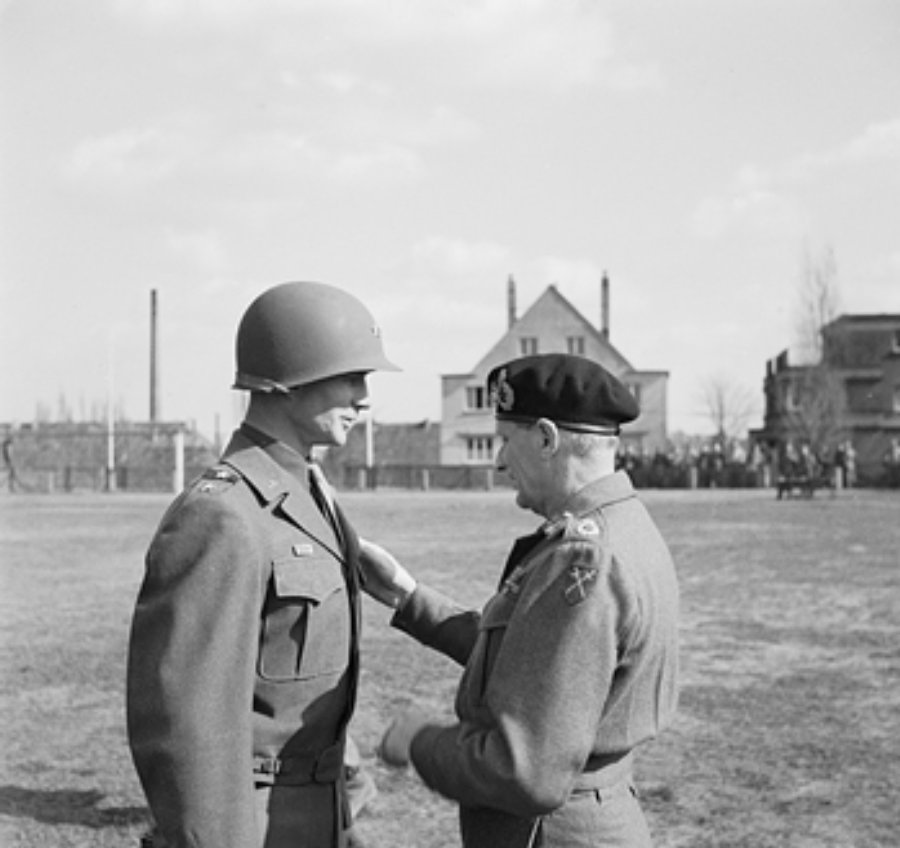
Gavin receiving the Distinguished Service Order from British Field Marshal Sir Bernard Montgomery in Mönchengladbach on 21 March 1945

Gavin became the youngest division commander since the Civil War when he assumed command of the 82nd Airborne Division on August 8, 1944, and was promoted to major general in October. For the first time, Gavin would lead the 82nd Airborne Division into combat. On Sunday, September 17, Operation Market Garden took off. Market Garden, devised by Field Marshal Sir Bernard Montgomery, consisted of an airborne attack of three British and American airborne divisions. The 82nd was to take the bridge across the Maas River in Grave, seize at least one of four bridges across the Maas–Waal Canal, and the bridge across the Waal river in Nijmegen. The 82nd was also to take control of the high grounds in the vicinity of Groesbeek, a small Dutch town near the German border. The ultimate objective of the offensive was Arnhem.

In the drop into the Netherlands, Gavin landed on hard pavement instead of grass, injuring his back. He had it inspected by a doctor a few days later, who claimed that his back was fine, and so Gavin continued normally throughout the entirety of the war. Five years later, he had his back examined at Walter Reed Hospital, where he learned that he had, in fact, fractured two vertebrae in the jump.

The failure of the 82nd to secure the Nijmegen Bridge on Day 1 of the operation delayed the XXX Corps relief column 36 hours and is considered one of several key reasons for the failure of the entire operation. As such, much controversy has swirled around the reasons for the delay and making the nearby Groesbeek Heights the priority. The contemporaneous reports of Lieutenant Colonel Norton (82nd G3) states that Gavin ordered Colonel Roy Lindquist (508th) to "attempt to seize the Nijmegen Bridge with a small force, not to exceed a battalion." With rumors of a large German armored formation nearby, Gavin initially made the decision to move most of his troops to the Groesbeek Heights rather than securing the Nijmegen Bridge. This decision left Lindquist confused about his orders, leading to the vital bridge being reinforced and in German hands for a further 36 hours. This seriously delayed XXX Corps relief of 1st Airborne Division at Arnhem and jeopardized the entire operation. The 504th took the bridge across the Waal river, but it was too late as the British paras of the 2nd Parachute Battalion, 1st Parachute Brigade of the British 1st Airborne Division, could not hold on any longer to their north side of the Arnhem Bridge and were defeated. The 82nd would stay in the Netherlands until November 13, when it was transferred to new billets in Sisonne et Suippes, France.

==== Battle of the Bulge and end of the war in Europe ====
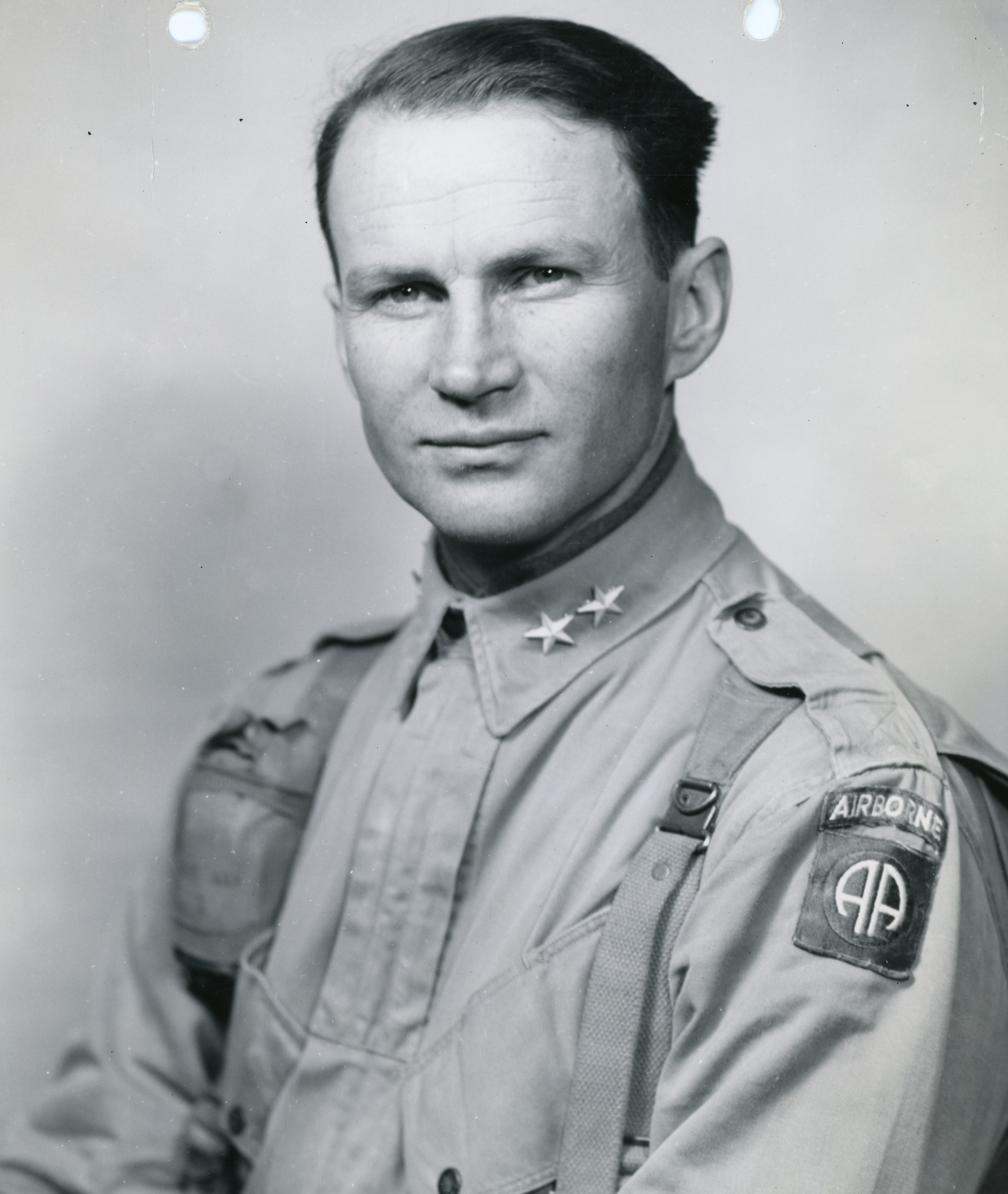
Gavin as 82nd Airborne Division commander c. February 1945

Gavin also led the 82nd during its fighting in the Battle of the Bulge in December 1944 and January 1945. The division was in SHAEF reserve in France at the start of the battle, and deployed as part of the Allied reaction to the German offensive. It operated in the northern sector of the battle, defending the towns of La Gleize and Stoumont against attacks by Kampfgruppe Peiper and elements of three Waffen-SS Panzer divisions. After the German offensive stalled, Gavin led the 82nd during the Allied counterattack in January 1945 that erased the German penetration.

After helping to secure the Ruhr, the 82nd Airborne Division ended the war at Ludwigslust past the Elbe River, accepting the surrender of over 150,000 men of Lieutenant General Kurt von Tippelskirch's 21st Army. When Gavin's 82nd crossed the river, in company with the British 6th Airborne Division, the 82nd Airborne Division moved 36 miles in one day and captured over 100,000 troops, causing great laughter in Bradley's 12th Army Group headquarters.

Following Germany's surrender, the 82nd Airborne Division entered Berlin for occupation duty, lasting from April until December 1945. In Berlin General George S. Patton was so impressed with the 82nd's honor guard he said, "In all my years in the Army and all the honor guards I have ever seen, the 82nd's honor guard is undoubtedly the best." Hence the "All-American" division also became known as "America's Guard of Honor". The war ended before their scheduled participation in the Allied invasion of Japan, Operation Downfall.

=== Post–World War II career ===
Gavin also played a central role in racially integrating the US military, beginning with his incorporation of the all-black 555th Parachute Infantry Battalion into the 82nd Airborne Division. The 555th's commander, Lieutenant Colonel Bradley Biggs, referred to Gavin as perhaps the most "color-blind" Army officer in the entire service. Biggs' unit distinguished itself as "smokejumpers" in 1945, combating forest fires and disarming Japanese balloon bombs.

After the war, Gavin went on to high command. He was a key player in stimulating the discussions which led to the Pentomic Division. As Army Chief of Research and Development and public author, he called for the use of mechanized troops transported by air to become a modern form of cavalry. He proposed deploying troops and light armored fighting vehicles by glider (or specially designed air dropped pod), aircraft, or helicopter to perform reconnaissance, raids, and screening operations. This led to the Howze Board, which had a great influence on the Army's use of helicopters, first seen during the Vietnam War.

Citing what he described as the "deteriorating" condition of the army, Gavin announced his retirement as a lieutenant general in January 1958, nine years before mandatory retirement at the age of 60. During his four years as head of research and development, the army's budget had decreased from $12.6 billion to $8.6 billion; Gavin said that he would have to defend the military budget before Congress but "I don't believe in next year's budget". Stating that "I feel I can do more on the outside for national defense than on the inside", he refused Secretary of the Army Wilbur Brucker's offer of promotion to full general to not retire. He wrote a book, War and Peace in the Space Age, published in mid-1958, which, among other things, detailed his reasons for leaving the army.

== Later years and death ==
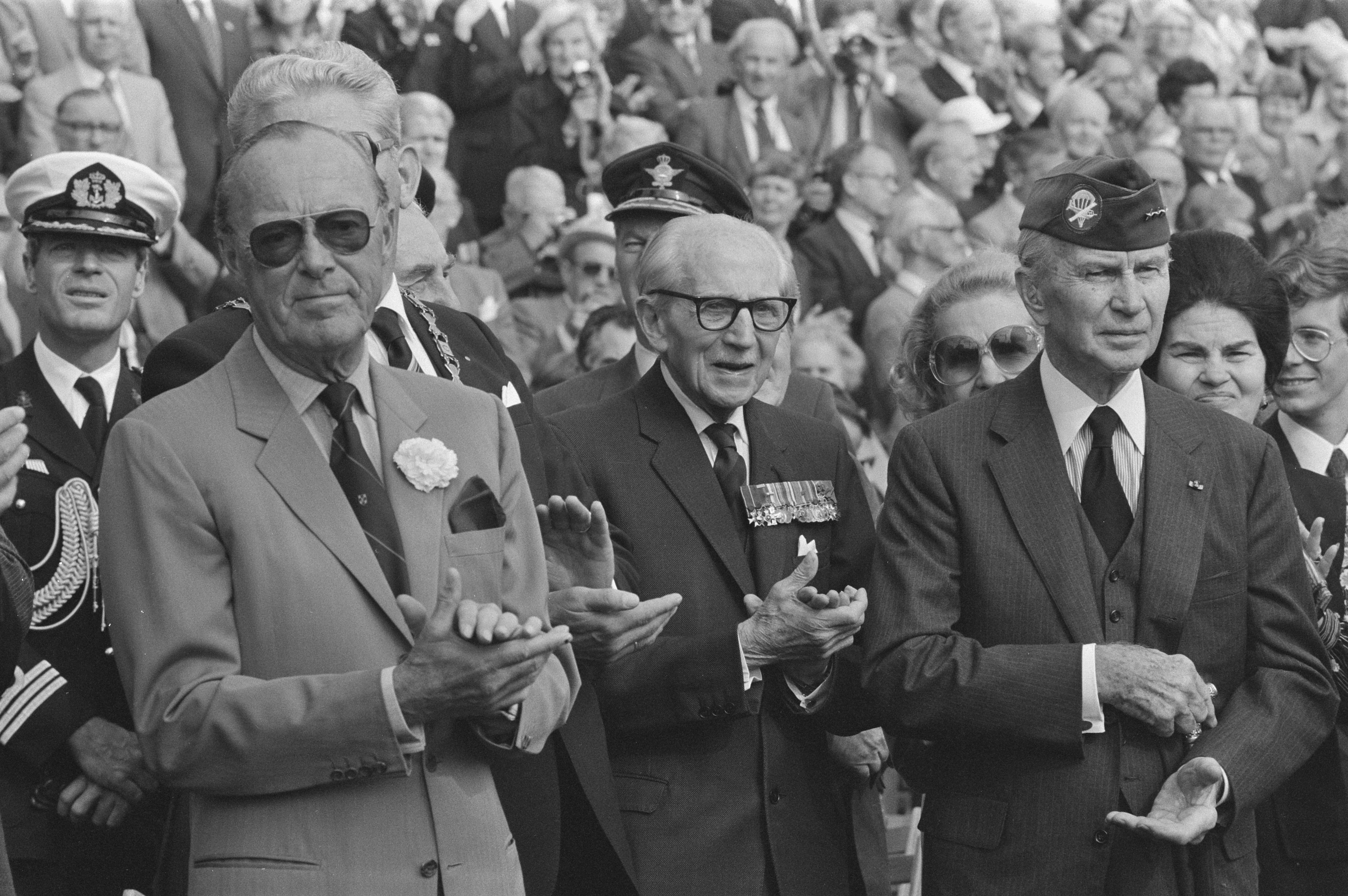
Opening of the National Liberation Museum in Nijmegen and commemoration of Operation Market Garden, 17 September 1984; from left to right: Prince Bernhard; British former Major-General Sir Allan HS Adair (former commander of the Guards Armoured Division); former US Lieutenant General James M. Gavin (former commander of the 82nd Airborne Division)

Upon retiring from the US Army, Gavin was recruited by an industrial research and consulting firm, Arthur D. Little, Inc. (ADL) He began as a vice president in 1958, became president of the company in 1960 and eventually served as both president and chairman of the board until his retirement in 1977. During his tenure at ADL, he grew a $10 million domestic company into a $70 million international company. Gavin remained as a consultant with ADL after his retirement. He served on the boards of several Boston organizations—the Museum of Fine Arts Boston, the Fletcher School of Law and Diplomacy, and Northeastern University—and some business boards as well.

In 1961, US President John F. Kennedy asked Gavin to take a leave of absence from ADL and serve as U.S. ambassador to France. Kennedy hoped Gavin would be able to improve deteriorating diplomatic relations with France, due to his experiences with the French during World War II, and his wartime relationship with France's president, General Charles de Gaulle. This proved to be a successful strategy and Gavin served as ambassador to France in 1961 and 1962. In 1977, President Jimmy Carter considered the 70-year-old Gavin for Director of the CIA before settling on Admiral Stansfield Turner.

Along with David Shoup and Matthew Ridgway, Gavin became one of the more visible former military critics of the Vietnam War. Due to this antiwar stance, Allard Lowenstein, leader of the Dump Johnson movement, asked him to oppose President Lyndon B. Johnson in the 1968 Democratic primaries, but Gavin declined. In 1968, Gavin endorsed Nelson Rockefeller for the Republican presidential nomination.

Gavin was portrayed by Robert Ryan in The Longest Day, and by Ryan O'Neal in A Bridge Too Far. Gavin served as an advisor on both films.

James Gavin died on 23 February 1990, and is buried to the immediate east of the Old Chapel at the United States Military Academy Post Cemetery at West Point. He was survived by his widow, Jean, his five daughters, ten grandchildren and three great-grandchildren.

== Private life ==
Gavin had a daughter named Barbara with his first wife. Barbara saved the letters her father sent to her during the war, and used them to write a 2007 book, The General and His Daughter: The War Time Letters of General James Gavin to his Daughter Barbara. Gavin had a reputation as a womanizer. Among his wartime lovers were the film star Marlene Dietrich and journalist Martha Gellhorn. Gavin and his wife Irma divorced after World War II in 1947. He married Jean Emert Duncan of Knoxville, Tennessee, in July 1948 and remained married to her until his death in 1990. He adopted Jean's daughter, Caroline Ann, by her first marriage. He and Jean had three daughters, Patricia Catherine, Marjorie Aileen, and Chloe Jean.

== Military awards ==
Gavin's military decorations and awards include:

Badges

Combat Infantryman Badge
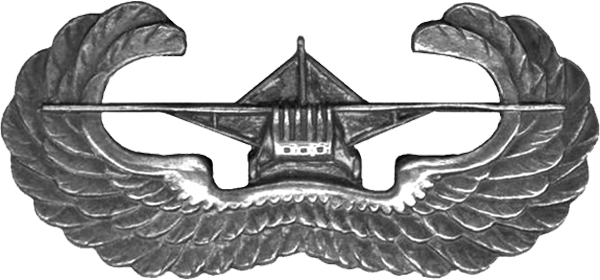
Airborne Glider Badge
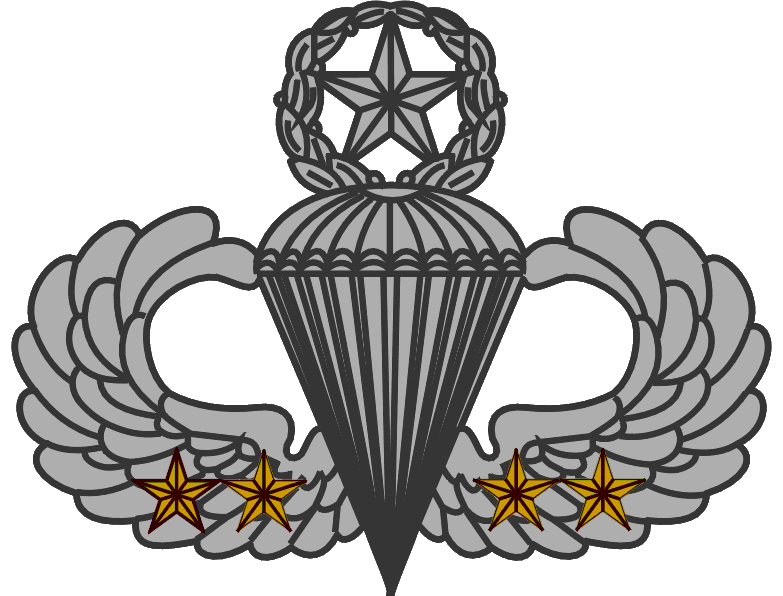
Master Combat Parachutist Badge with four jump stars

Decorations

Distinguished Service Cross with bronze oak leaf cluster
Army Distinguished Service Medal
Silver Star with bronze oak leaf cluster
Bronze Star
Purple Heart
Army Commendation Medal

Unit Award

Army Presidential Unit Citation

Service Medals

American Defense Service Medal
American Campaign Medal
European-African-Middle Eastern Campaign Medal with Arrowhead device, silver and bronze campaign stars
World War II Victory Medal
Army of Occupation Medal with 'Germany' clasp
National Defense Service Medal

Foreign Awards

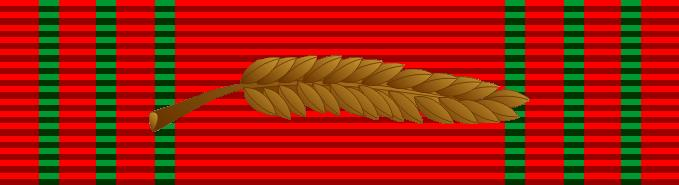
British Distinguished Service Order
Legion of Honour (Grand Officer)
French Croix de guerre with Palm
Belgian Croix de guerre with Palm
Netherlands Order of Orange-Nassau (Grand Officer) with swords
Order of Alexander Nevsky (Union of Soviet Socialist Republics)

== Dates of rank ==
Insignia	Rank	Component	Date
No insignia	Private	Coast Artillery Corps	7 April 1924
No insignia	Cadet	United States Military Academy	1 July 1925
	Second Lieutenant	Regular Army	13 June 1929
	First Lieutenant	Regular Army	1 November 1934
	Captain	Regular Army	13 June 1939
	Major	Army of the United States	10 October 1941
	Lieutenant Colonel	Army of the United States	1 February 1942
	Colonel	Army of the United States	25 September 1942
	Brigadier General	Army of the United States	23 September 1943
	Major General	Army of the United States	20 October 1944
	Major	Regular Army	13 June 1946
	Colonel	Regular Army	10 June 1948
	Brigadier General	Regular Army	2 May 1953
	Major General	Regular Army	13 July 1954
	Lieutenant General	Army of the United States	24 March 1955
	Lieutenant General	Retired List	31 March 1958

== Books ==
Gavin authored five books:

- Airborne Warfare (1947), a discussion of the development and future of aircraft delivered forces
- War and Peace in the Space Age (1958), a discussion of why he left the army, what he considered the perilously inadequate state of US military, scientific, and technological development at that time, his views of the reasons for it, and precise goals he thought the US needed to achieve for its national defense
- France and the Civil War in America (co-authored with André Maurois; 1962)
- Crisis Now (with Arthur Hadley; 1968) offered specific solutions to end the Vietnam War, observations on what he thought were America's domestic problems, and proposed solutions for them
- On to Berlin: Battles of an Airborne Commander 1943–1946 (1976), an account of his experiences commanding the 82nd Airborne Division.

== Memorials ==
The street that leads to the Waal Bridge in Nijmegen is now called General James Gavin Street. Near to the location of his parachute drop during Operation Market-Garden in Groesbeek a residential area is named in his honour.

A street in Thorpe Astley, a suburb of Leicester, England, was named Gavin Close in his honour. Thorpe Astley forms part of Braunstone Town in which Gavin was stationed at Braunstone Hall, prior to the D-Day landings.

There is also a small memorial in his native Mount Carmel, Pennsylvania, where he grew up, commemorating his service. There are also two memorials in Osterville, Massachusetts, where he and his family spent summers for many years. In 1975, American Electric Power completed the 2,600-megawatt General James M. Gavin Power Plant on the Ohio River, near Cheshire, Ohio. The plant boasts dual stacks of 830 feet and dual cooling towers of 430 feet. It is the largest coal-fired power facility in Ohio, and one of the largest in the nation.

In 1986, the 505th Parachute Infantry Regiment created the "Gavin Squad Competition". This competition was designed to identify the most proficient rifle squad in the regiment. The original competition was won by a squad from 1st Platoon, Bravo Company, 3/505th PIR. Gavin was on hand to award the nine man squad their trophy.

The Gavin Cup is an award recognizing the top Company/Troop/Battery-level organization in the 82nd Airborne Division. Awarded on a quarterly basis, the award criteria are centered on unit readiness and competition amongst all Company/Troop/Battery-sized units in the division and is two-phased. The first is submission of unit readiness-based metrics data. The top three scoring units send teams deliberately selected on short notice to compete in marksmanship, physical fitness, and combat preparation. The top scoring unit is awarded the Gavin Cup.

The Fort Bragg and XVIII Airborne Corps Joint Innovation Outpost is formally named the LTG James M. Gavin Joint Innovation Outpost. The JIOP held its ribbon cutting in January 2026. It was named after him due to his understanding of the importance of innovation.

== See also ==
- Robert Frederick
- Dean C. Strother

== General and cited references ==
- Ambrose, Stephen (1997). Citizen Soldiers. Touchstone. ISBN 0-684-84801-5.
- Atkinson, Rick (2007), The Day of Battle, The War in Sicily and Italy, 1943–1944, The Liberation Trilogy, vol. II, New York: Henry Holt, ISBN 978-0-8050-6289-2
- Booth, T. Michael; Spencer, Duncan (2013). Paratrooper: The Life of General James M. Gavin. Casemate. ISBN 978-1-61200-127-2.
- Lewis Sorley, ed. (2022). Gavin at War: The World War II Diary of Lieutenant General James M. Gavin. Casemate. ISBN 978-1-63624-024-4.
- Fauntleroy, Barbara Gavin. The General and His Daughter: The Wartime Letters of General James M. Gavin to His Daughter Barbara. New York: Fordham University Press, 2007.
- Gavin, James M. The James M. Gavin Papers. U.S. Army Military History Institute, Carlisle Barracks, Pennsylvania.
- LoFaro, Guy. The Sword of St. Michael: The 82nd Airborne Division in World War II. Cambridge, Massachusetts: Da Capo, 2011.
- The General Gavin interview in Yank Magazine, April 1, 1945

Military offices
Preceded by Matthew Ridgway	Commanding General 82nd Airborne Division; 1944–1948	Succeeded by Clovis E. Byers
Preceded by Withers A. Burress	Commanding General VII Corps; 1952–1954	Succeeded by Henry I. Hodes
Diplomatic posts
Preceded by Amory Houghton	United States Ambassador to France; 1961–1962	Succeeded by Charles E. Bohlen
