= Mission Boston =

D-Day parachute assault

Mission Boston was a parachute combat assault at night by Major General Matthew Ridgway's U.S. 82nd Airborne Division on June 6, 1944, part of the American airborne landings in Normandy during World War II. Boston was a component element of Operation Neptune, the assault portion of the Allied invasion of Normandy, codenamed Operation Overlord. 6,420 paratroopers jumped from nearly 370 Douglas C-47 Skytrain troop carrier aircraft into an intended objective area of roughly 10 square miles (26 km^{2}) located on either side of the Merderet river on the Cotentin Peninsula of France, five hours ahead of the beach landings.

The drops were scattered by bad weather and German anti-aircraft fire over an area three to four times as large as that planned. Two inexperienced units of the 82nd, the 507th and 508th Parachute Infantry Regiments (PIR), were given the mission of blocking approaches west of the Merderet River, but most of their paratroops missed their drop zones entirely. The veteran 505th PIR jumped accurately and captured its objective, the town of Sainte-Mère-Église, which proved essential to the success of the division.

== Overview ==
The division was a veteran outfit, with two of its units, the 504th and 505th Parachute Infantry Regiments, having made combat jumps into Sicily and Italy. However, the 504th had not arrived in England in time to train for Operation Neptune, and had been replaced in the mission by the inexperienced 507th and 508th PIRs, both temporarily attached for the operation (the 507th later transferring to the 17th Airborne Division). Because of its previous combat experience, the 82nd Airborne Division was assigned the riskier of the two jump missions, into the center of the Cotentin. Its final regiment, the 325th Glider Infantry Regiment, was scheduled to fly in on June 7.

The 82nd Airborne Division's objectives were to capture the town of Sainte Mère Église, a crucial communications crossroad behind Utah Beach, and to block the approaches into the area from the west and southwest. They were to seize causeways and bridges over the Merderet at La Fière and Chef-du-Pont, destroy the highway bridge over the Douve River at Pont l'Abbé (now Étienville), and secure the area west of Sainte Mère Église to establish a defensive line between Gourbesville and Renouf.

In the process units would also disrupt German communications, establish roadblocks to hamper the movement of German reinforcements, establish a defensive line between Neuville and Baudienville to the north, clear the area of the drop zones to the unit boundary at Les Forges and link up with the 101st Airborne Division, under Major General Maxwell D. Taylor.

To complete its assignments, the 82nd Airborne Division divided itself into three forces:

- Force A (parachute): the three parachute infantry regiments and support detachments, commanded by assistant division commander Brigadier General James M. Gavin,
- Force B (glider): the glider infantry regiment, artillery battalions, and airborne support elements, commanded by the division commander Major General Ridgway, and
- Force C (seaborne): remaining combat elements, division support troops and attached units including tanks, landing at Utah Beach, commanded by Brigadier General George P. Howell.

== Mission description ==
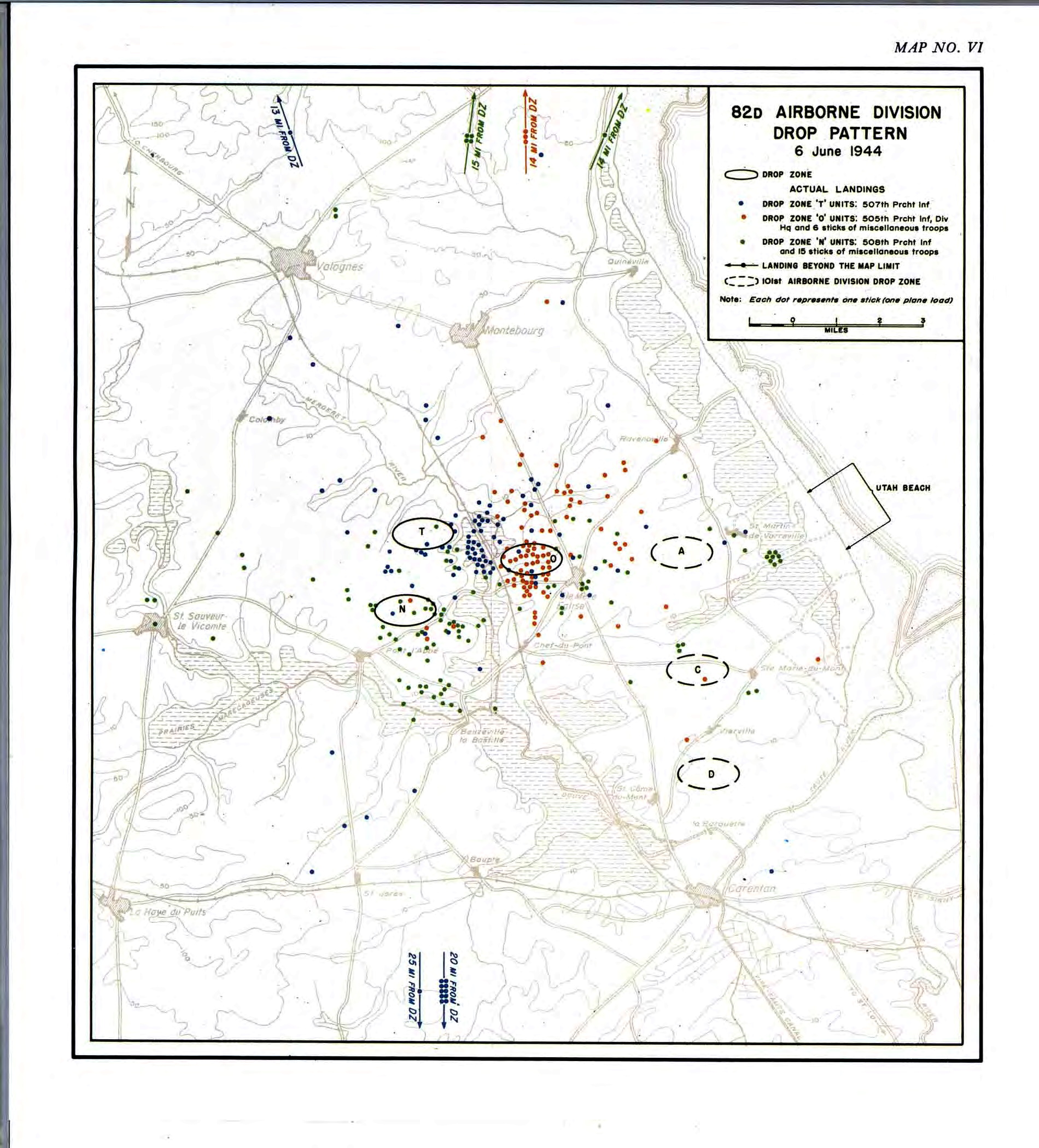
82nd Airborne drop pattern, D-Day, 6 June 1944.

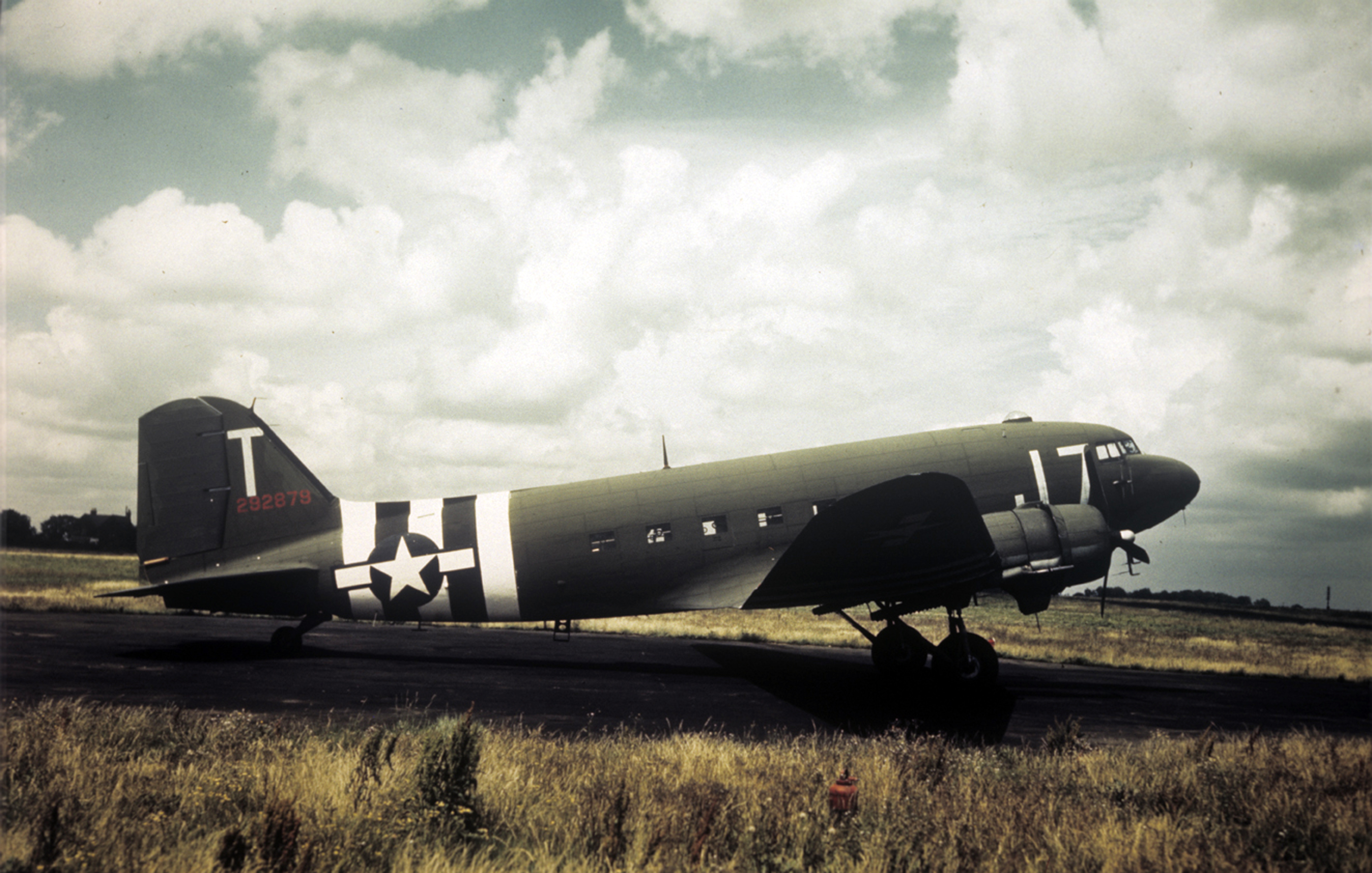
C-47 of the 303rd TCS/442nd TCG in invasion markings. The 442nd TCG carried the 1st Battalion, 507th Parachute Infantry Regiment on D-Day.

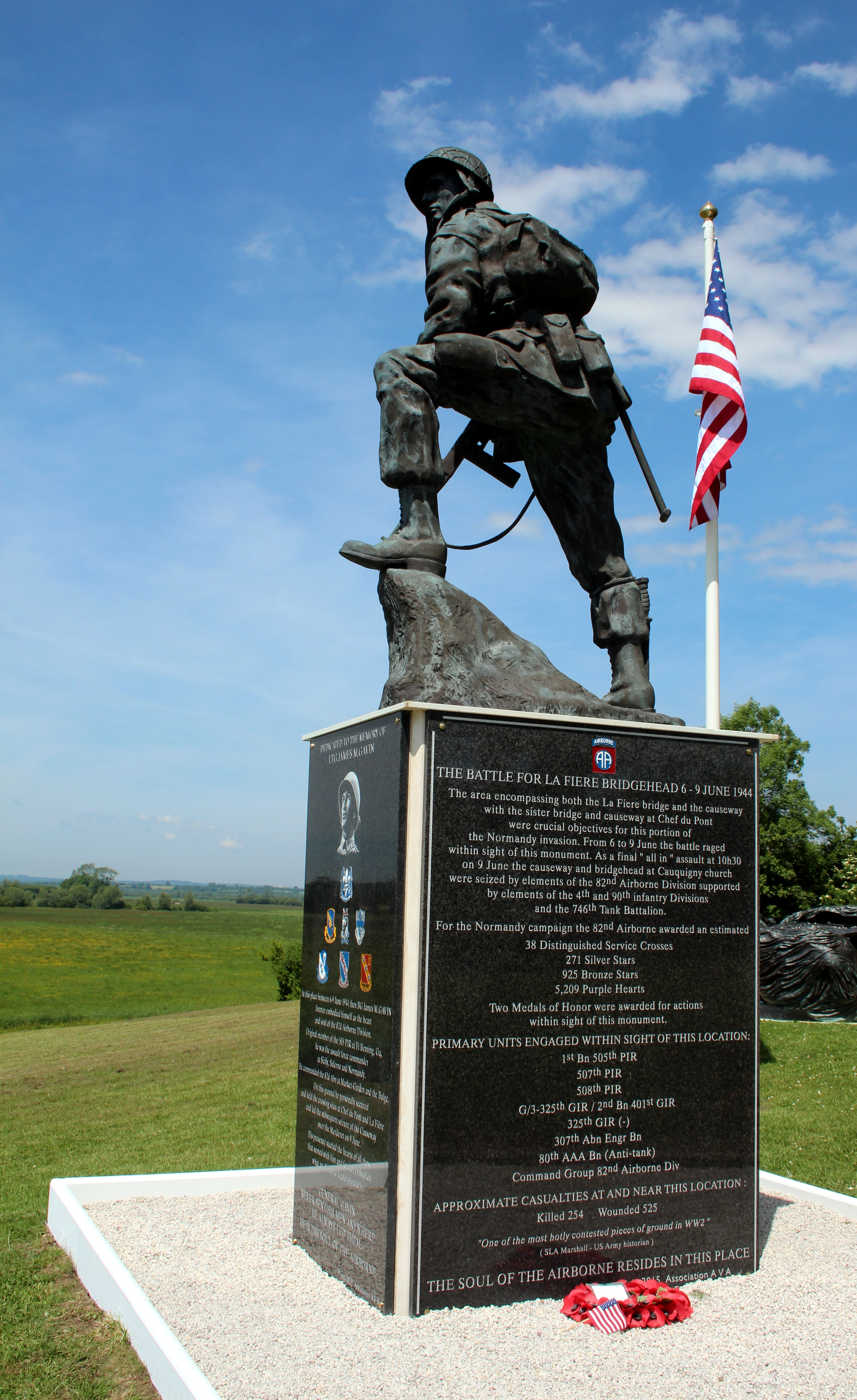
Statue of General James Gavin at the La Fiere Bridgehead

Boston was the second of two combat jumps, with "Mission Albany" preceding it by one hour to drop the 101st Airborne Division. Each mission consisted of three regimental-sized air landings. Drop Zones T and N were west of the Merderet River from north to south, and Drop Zone O was east of it, just northwest of Sainte Mère Église.

Each of its parachute infantry regiments (PIR) was transported by three or four "serials", formations containing 36, 45, or 54 C-47s, totalling ten serials and 369 aircraft. The planes, individually numbered within a serial by "chalk numbers" (literally numbers chalked on the airplanes to aid paratroopers in boarding the correct airplane), were organized into flights in trail, in a close pattern called "vee's of vee's" (three planes in triangular vee's arranged in a larger vee of nine planes). The serials were scheduled over the drop zones at six-minute intervals. The paratroopers were organized into "sticks", a plane load of troops numbering 15-18 men.

The main combat assaults were preceded at each drop zone by three teams of pathfinders that arrived thirty minutes before the main assault to set up navigation aids, including Eureka radar transponder beacons and marker lights, to aid the C-47s in locating the DZs in the dark.

To achieve surprise, the parachute drops were routed to approach Normandy at low altitude from the west. The serials took off beginning at 22:30 on June 5, assembled into formations, and flew southwest over the English Channel at 500 feet (150 m) above sea level to remain below German radar coverage. Once over water all lights except formation lights were turned off, and these were reduced to their lowest practical intensity. At a stationary marker boat code-named "Hoboken" and carrying a Eureka beacon they made a left turn to the southeast and flew between the Channel Islands of Guernsey and Alderney to their initial point on the Cotentin coast near Les Pieux, code-named "Peoria".

Over the Cotentin Peninsula numerous factors negatively affected the accuracy of the drops, including a solid cloud bank over the entire western half of the 22-mile (35 km) wide peninsula at penetration altitude (1500 feet MSL), an opaque ground fog over many drop zones, and intense German anti-aircraft fire ("flak"). The weather conditions broke up and dispersed many formations and the ground fire scattered them even more. However, the primary factor limiting success of the paratroop units, because it magnified all the errors resulting from the above factors, was the decision to make a massive parachute drop at night.

== Parachute assault ==
=== Missed drop zones ===
The 82nd Airborne Division's drop, mission "Boston", began at 01:51. The 505th PIR, assigned to jump on Drop Zone O, was scheduled to arrive ten minutes after the last serial of the 101st Airborne Division's drop. The C-47s carrying the 505th did not experience or else overcame the difficulties that had plagued the 101st Airborne Division's drops. Pathfinders on DZ O turned on their Eureka beacons as the first 82nd Airborne Division serial crossed the initial point and lighted holophane markers on all three battalion assembly areas. The 2nd Battalion, first to jump, was accurate but jumped from above the planned altitude. C-47s carrying the 3rd and 1st Battalions were off course but adjusted in time to jump. Most flights were able to fly in formation above the clouds and none encountered serious anti-aircraft opposition. As a result, the veteran 505th PIR enjoyed the most accurate of the D-Day drops, half the regiment dropping on or within a mile of its DZ, and 75% within two miles (3 km).

The other regiments were more significantly dispersed and eight aircraft were shot down, several with paratroopers still inside. The 508th experienced the worst drop of any of the PIRs. A platoon leader of the 508th, First Lieutenant Robert P. Mathias, who was struck by a blast of fire yet still managed to lead his team out of the plane.

The 508th serials had not seen the clouds and flew through, rather than over, them, with C-47s taking evasive action to avoid collisions. Minutes later they emerged into fierce antiaircraft fire. In need of pathfinder aids, the pilots discovered that the sets near DZ N were ineffective or not turned on. The flight leaders navigated accurately to the drop zone, but most of their flights were no longer in formation. 25% of the 508th Parachute Infantry Regiment came down within a mile of the DZ, and another quarter within 2 miles (3.2 km). Fully half the regiment was unavailable for its assigned tasks, however, because it dropped east of the Merderet, and half of those jumped more than 10 miles (16 km) away or were missing.

First Lieutenant Malcolm D. Brannen, Headquarters Company, 3rd Battalion, 508th PIR came down between Picauville and Étienville, south of the DZ. Near dawn, just after observing the landing of reinforcements by gliders in Mission Chicago, Brannen and the group of paratroopers he had assembled fired on an automobile headed for Picauville at high speed, and in a brief firefight, Brannen shot and killed Generalleutnant Wilhelm Falley, division commander of the German 91st Air Landing Division (a regular infantry division).

The 507th's pathfinders landed accurately on DZ T, but because of Germans nearby, marker lights could not be turned on. Many of its C-47s straggled and only three sticks jumped on the DZ. From 30 to 50 sticks (450-750 troops) landed nearby in grassy swampland along the river. Estimates of drowning casualties vary from "a few" to "scores" (against an overall D-Day loss in the 82nd of 156 killed in action), but much equipment was lost and the troops had difficulty assembling.

Almost 30 sticks of the 507th PIR came down in 101st Airborne Division areas and became temporarily attached to that division. The headquarters company of the 1st Battalion, carried by the last serial of the night, was dropped 5 miles (8.0 km) beyond Carentan at Montmartin-en-Graignes. They rallied other stragglers and fought off attacks by the 17th SS Panzergrenadier Division for five days before 150 managed to infiltrate back to Carentan in small groups.

=== Sainte Mère Eglise ===
Timely assembly enabled the 505th PIR to accomplish two of its missions on schedule. The 3rd Battalion captured Sainte Mère Eglise by 04:30 after small firefights. It set out roadblocks and took up defensive positions against expected counterattacks. The 2nd Battalion established a blocking position on the northern approaches to Sainte Mère Eglise with a single platoon (3rd Platoon, D Company) while the rest of the unit reinforced the 3rd Battalion when it came under heavy attack from the south by infantry and armor at mid-morning. The platoon delayed two companies of the 1058th Grenadier Regiment at Neuville-au-Plain for eight hours, allowing the troops in Sainte Mère Église to repel the southern threat. The 3rd Battalion, 505th PIR may have been given credit for securing Sainte Mere Eglise, but it was parts of F Company of the 2nd Battalion which landed in downtown Sainte Mere Eglise. Private John Steele, one of the men hanging on the church steeple, was in F Company. Additionally, some of the RAF Cottesmore aircraft used for the Normandy drop were C-53 Skytroopers.

=== Along the Merderet ===
According to some historians, the 1st Battalion, 505th did not achieve its objectives of capturing bridges over the Merderet at Manoir de la Fière and Chef-du-Pont. This account is disputed by both the Company and Regimental commanders. This version states that Company A was unable to take the bridge near la Fière, a farm two miles (3 km) west of Sainte Mère Église, despite the assistance of several hundred troopers from both the 507th and 508th PIRs that had jumped in the area. After several attempts to force a passage over the causeway or outflank the defenses had failed, Brig. Gen. Gavin, the ADC, began committing troops elsewhere and accompanied one force to take the bridge at Chef-du-Pont.

The company commander of Able Company, Captain John "Red Dog" Dolan categorically denies this view, stating that Company A took the bridge. This was in response to a questionnaire sent by famed author Cornelius Ryan. Dolan presents a detailed response which was forwarded on to the author as an accurate account by Gavin. Dolan states: "The most glaring inaccuracy is about the bridge being lost. For the record, this bridge was held by Company "A" from the time of its capture on "D" Day, until we were relieved".

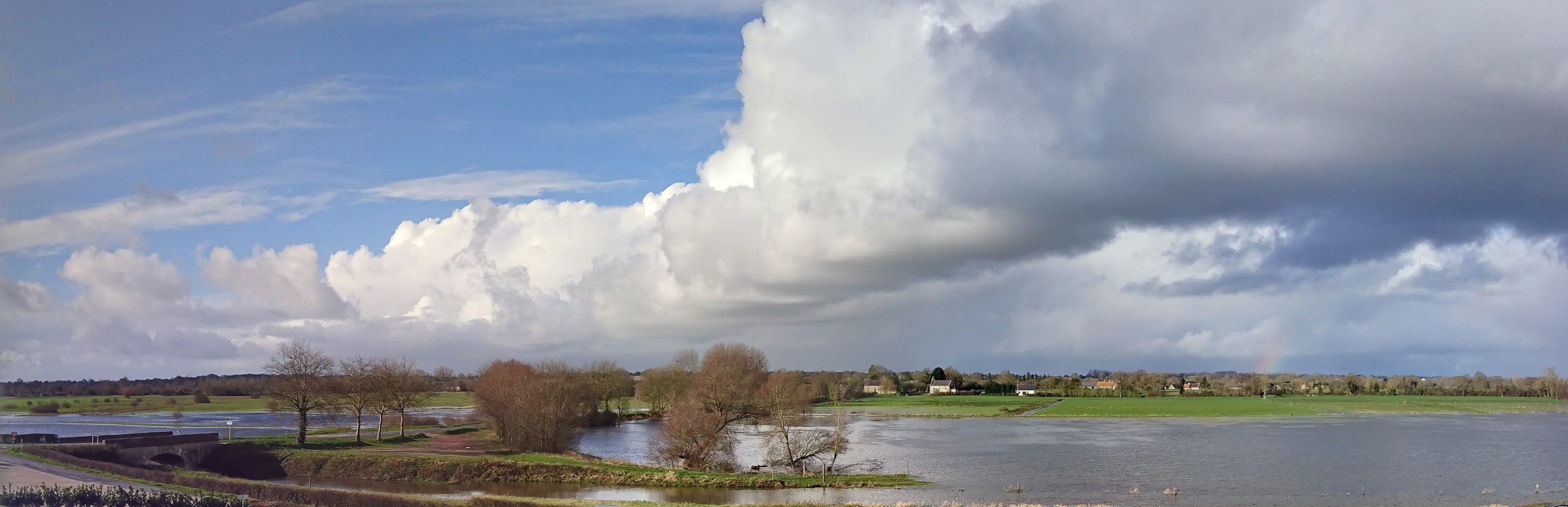
La Fière bridge (left) and the flooded marshes of the Merderet river.

Colonel Roy E. Lindquist, commanding officer of the 508th PIR, was left in charge at Manoir de la Fière and led an assault at noon that eradicated the German defense, effecting a link up with an isolated group on the west bank. Through miscommunication and poor assumptions, the lodgment was not consolidated and was overrun by a German counterattack an hour later. A counterattack by Company B of the 508th crossed the bridge but was broken up and the survivors forced to swim the river to safety.

Lindquist brought the entire 1st Battalion, 505th PIR into the line to defend against further counterattacks. Supported by intense artillery and mortar fire, the 1057th Grenadier Regiment and the 100th Replacement Tank Battalion (100.Panzer Ersatz und Ausbildungs Abteilung, a training unit with captured French tanks and obsolete German ones such as Panzer III tanks.) overran the 1st Battalion command post late in the afternoon of June 6 before being stopped by bazookas and a 57 mm anti-tank gun, destroying several tanks on the La Fière causeway. Gavin returned from Chef-du-Pont and withdrew all but a platoon to beef up the defense at Manoir de la Fière.

None of the 82nd Airborne Division's objectives of clearing areas west of the Merderet and destroying bridges over the Douve were achieved on D-Day. However one makeshift battalion of the 508th PIR seized a small hill near the Merderet and disrupted German counterattacks on Chef-du-Pont for three days, effectively accomplishing its mission. Two company-sized pockets of the 507th held out behind the German center of resistance at Amfreville until relieved by the seizure of the causeway on June 9.

== Air movement table ==
Mission Boston
Serial	Airborne unit	Troop carrier Group	# of C-47s	UK base	Drop zone	Drop zone time
4	Pathfinders	1st Pathfinder Prov.	3	RAF North Witham	O	0121
5	Pathfinders	1st Pathfinder Prov.	3	RAF North Witham	N	0138
17	2nd Bn, 505th PIR	316th TCG	36	RAF Cottesmore	O	0151
18	3rd Bn, 505th PIR; 456th Para FA (-)	316th TCG	36	RAF Cottesmore	O	0157
6	Pathfinders	1st Pathfinder Prov.	3	RAF North Witham	T	0202
19	1st Bn, 505th PIR; HHC 505th Div HQ	315th TCG	48	RAF Spanhoe	O	0203
20	2nd Bn, 508th PIR	314th TCG	36	RAF Saltby	N	0208
21	HQ 508th PIR; Co B, 307th Engr Bn	314th TCG	24	RAF Saltby	N	0214
22	1st Bn, 508th PIR	313th TCG	36	RAF Folkingham	N	0220
23	3rd Bn, 508th PIR	313th TCG	36	RAF Folkingham	N	0226
24	2nd Bn, 507th PIR	61st TCG	36	RAF Barkston Heath	T	0232
25	3rd Bn, 507th PIR	61st TCG	36	RAF Barkston Heath	T	0238
26	1st Bn, 507th PIR	442nd TCG	45	RAF Fulbeck	T	0244
