= Robert Mathias =

Robert Mathias may refer to:

- Bob Mathias (1930–2006), American decathlete, politician, and actor
- Robert P. Mathias, United States Army officer, the first American officer killed by German fire on D-Day
- Robert Mathias (rugby league), Papua New Guinean rugby league footballer
