= Benjamin H. Vandervoort =

United States Army officer (1917–1990)

- Born: March 3, 1917; Gasport, New York, United States
- Died: November 18, 1990 (aged 73); Hilton Head Island, South Carolina, United States
- Military career
- Allegiance: United States
- Branch: United States Army
- Service years: 1937−1946
- Rank: Colonel
- Nickname: "Vandy"
- Service number: 0-22715
- Unit: Infantry Branch
- Commands: 2nd Battalion, 505th Parachute Infantry Regiment, 82nd Airborne Division
- Conflicts: World War II
- Awards: Distinguished Service Cross (2)
- Other work: CIA

Benjamin Hayes "Vandy" Vandervoort (March 3, 1917 − November 18, 1990) was an officer of the United States Army who fought with distinction in World War II. He was twice awarded the Distinguished Service Cross. He was portrayed by John Wayne in the 1962 war film The Longest Day.

== Early life and military career ==
Vandervoort attended Washington College in Chestertown, Maryland, where he was a member of the Washington Players drama club, the YMCA, the Mount Vernon Literary Society, and the football and track teams. He was also an officer of the Theta Chi fraternity. He graduated with a Bachelor of Arts degree in 1938, having enlisted in the army as a private on 23 July 1937. He was commissioned with the rank of second lieutenant on 16 March 1938.

== World War II ==
Vandervoort transferred to the newly established paratroopers in the summer of 1940, and was promoted to first lieutenant on 10 October 1941. Promoted to captain on 3 August 1942, almost eight months after the American entry into World War II, he served as a company commander in the 505th Parachute Infantry Regiment (PIR), commanded by Colonel James M. Gavin. He was promoted to major on 28 April 1943, a few weeks after the 505th had been assigned to the 82nd Airborne Division, then commanded by Major General Matthew Ridgway, and served as operations officer (S-3) in Colonel Reuben Tucker's 504th Parachute Regimental Combat Team in the Allied invasion of Sicily and in the landings at Salerno.

Promoted to lieutenant colonel on 1 June 1944, he was the commanding officer of the 2nd Battalion, 505th PIR, during the American airborne landings in Normandy. Vandervoort led his battalion in defending the town of Sainte-Mère-Église on 6 June in "Mission Boston", despite having broken his ankle on landing. During "Operation Market Garden" in September 1944, he led the assault on the Waal Bridge at Nijmegen while the 3rd Battalion, 504th PIR, made the assault crossing. Ridgway described Vandervoort as "one of the bravest and toughest battle commanders I ever knew". At Goronne he was wounded by mortar fire, so was unable to take part in the 82nd Airborne Divisions' advance into Germany in 1945.

== Post war ==
He was promoted to colonel on 7 July 1946, and left the Army on 31 August. After studying at Ohio State University he joined the Foreign Service in 1947. He served as an executive officer in the Department of the Army in 1950-54, acting as joint political adviser to the commanding general United Nations forces and UN ambassador, Korea, in 1951-52, and studied at the Armed Forces Staff College (now the Joint Forces Staff College) in 1953. He served as an attaché at the US embassy in Lisbon, Portugal, in 1955-58, and was assigned to the Department of State in 1958-60. He then served in the Executive Office of the Central Intelligence Agency (CIA), from 1960 to 1966, also serving as a consultant on politico-military affairs to the US Army Staff in 1960, and as a plans and program officer on the Army Staff, Department of Defense, in 1964.

Benjamin Vandervoort died on November 18, 1990, at the age of 73 at a nursing home from the effects of a fall.

He had two children with his wife Nedra; a son (Benjamin Hayes Vandervoort II) and a daughter (Marlin Vandervoort).

=== Awards and decorations ===
Parachutist Badge

Distinguished Service Cross with oak leaf cluster
Bronze Star with oak leaf cluster
Purple Heart with two oak leaf clusters
Croix de Guerre with palms (France)
Bronze Lion (The Netherlands)
Fourragère (Belgium)

In the early 1990s, the United States Army Center for Leadership at Fort Leavenworth, Kansas, selected one or two colonels or lieutenant colonels from every American War from the Revolution to Vietnam. Colonel Vandervoort was selected as the outstanding ground battle commander for World War II. He is honored by a brief biography and several photographs in what is known as "Leadership Hallway" located on the second floor of Bell Hall.

== Portrayed in film ==
Vandervoort was portrayed by actor John Wayne in the film version of Cornelius Ryan's history of D-Day, The Longest Day. The role was actively sought by Charlton Heston, but the last-minute decision of John Wayne to take a role in the film prevented Heston from participating. At the time of filming in 1962, Wayne was 55 – 28 years older than the 27-year-old Vandervoort had been on D-Day, and still ten years older than Vandervoort was when the film was made.

== In museum ==
Original World War II uniforms and memorabilia of Col. Ben Vandervoort are on display at this museum:

D-Day Experience – Saint-Come-du-Mont – Normandy, France

== Bibliography ==
- Michel de Trez: Col. Ben Vandervoort "Vandy" 0-22715 (Way We Were), D-Day Publishing, 2004, ISBN 2-9600176-7-6
