= Chef-du-Pont =

- Part of Sainte-Mère-Église
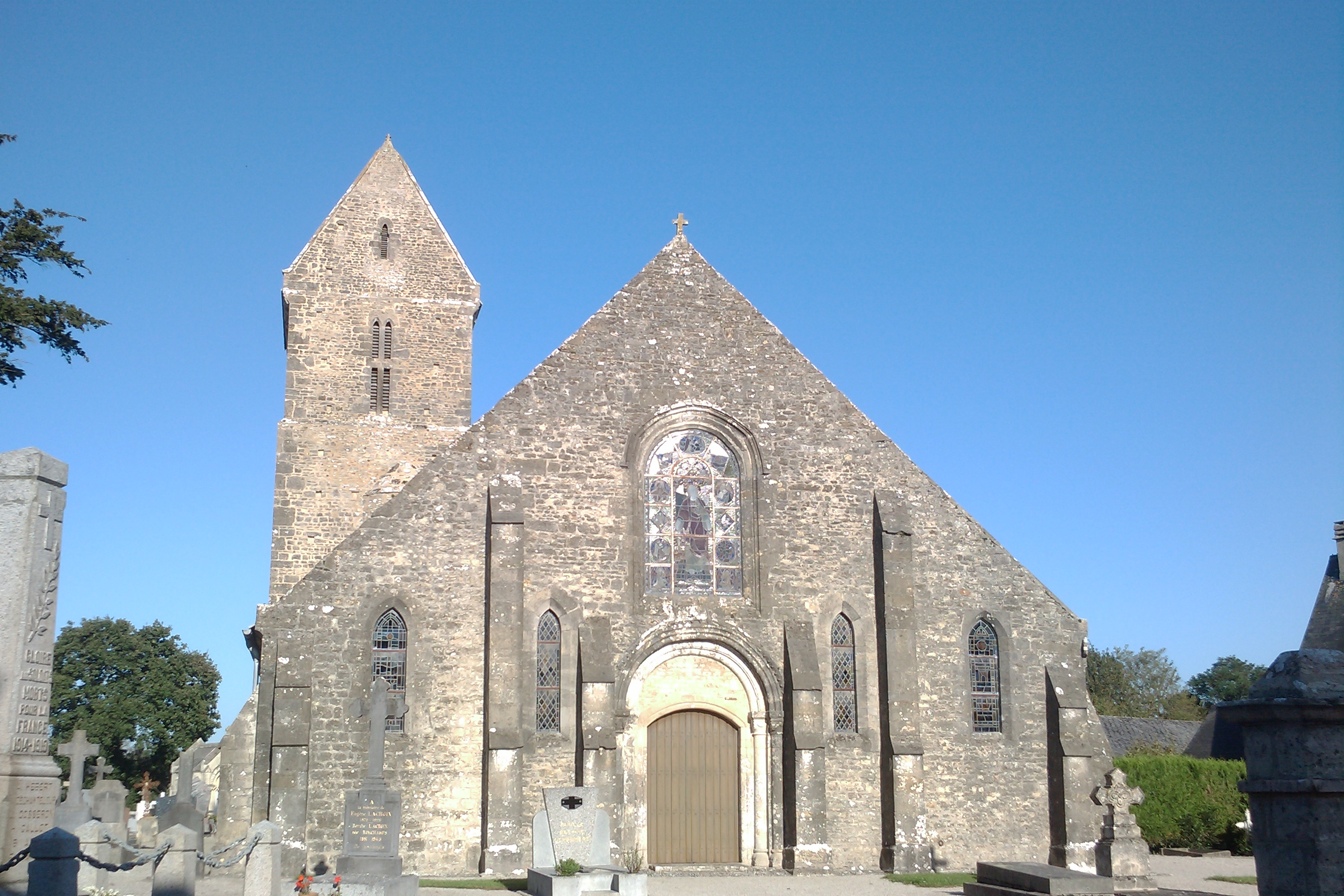
- The church of Sainte-Colombe
- Location of Chef-du-Pont
- Location within France Location within Normandy
- Coordinates: 49°23′07″N 1°20′35″W
- Country: France
- Region: Normandy
- Department: Manche
- Arrondissement: Cherbourg
- Canton: Carentan
- Commune: Sainte-Mère-Église
- Area^{1}: 3.78 km^{2} (1.46 sq mi)
- Elevation: 8 m (26 ft)
- Highest elevation: 18 m (59 ft)
- Lowest elevation: 0 m (0 ft)
- Population (2022): 624
  - Density: 165/km^{2} (428/sq mi)
- Time zone: UTC+01:00 (CET)
  - Summer (DST): UTC+02:00 (CEST)
- Postal code: 50480
- ^{1} French Land Register data, which excludes lakes, ponds, glaciers > 1 km^{2} (0.386 sq mi or 247 acres) and river estuaries.

Chef-du-Pont (French pronunciation: [ʃɛf dy pɔ̃]) is a former commune in the Manche department in Normandy in north-western France. On 1 January 2016, it was merged into the commune of Sainte-Mère-Église.

During World War 2, as part of the opening phase of Operation Overlord, due to the crossing point on the Merderet River, Chef-du-Pont was a priority objective of the Allies. The objective was part of the 82nd Airborne Mission Boston parachute assault.

== See also ==
- Communes of the Manche department
