= Écoquenéauville =

- Part of Sainte-Mère-Église
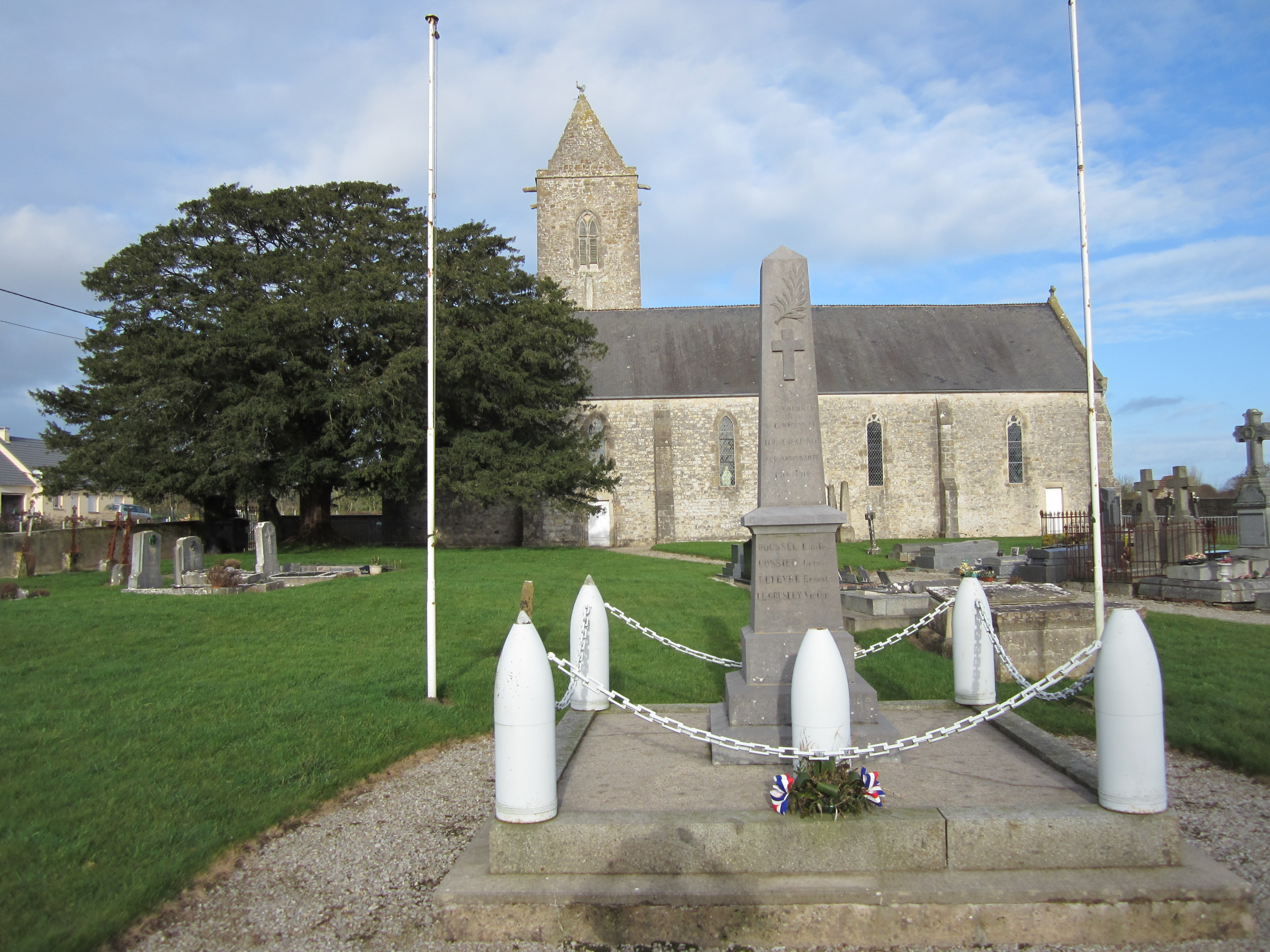
- The church of Saint-Laurent d'Écoquenéauville and the war memorial
- Location of Écoquenéauville
- Location within France Location within Normandy
- Coordinates: 49°24′09″N 1°17′27″W
- Country: France
- Region: Normandy
- Department: Manche
- Arrondissement: Cherbourg
- Canton: Carentan
- Commune: Sainte-Mère-Église
- Area^{1}: 3.52 km^{2} (1.36 sq mi)
- Elevation: 18 m (59 ft)
- Highest elevation: 37 m (121 ft)
- Lowest elevation: 5 m (16 ft)
- Population (2022): 94
  - Density: 27/km^{2} (69/sq mi)
- Time zone: UTC+01:00 (CET)
  - Summer (DST): UTC+02:00 (CEST)
- Postal code: 50480
- ^{1} French Land Register data, which excludes lakes, ponds, glaciers > 1 km^{2} (0.386 sq mi or 247 acres) and river estuaries.

Écoquenéauville (French pronunciation: [ekɔkneovil]) is a former commune in the Manche department in Normandy in north-western France. On 1 January 2016, it was merged into the commune of Sainte-Mère-Église.

== See also ==
- Communes of the Manche department
