= Merderet =

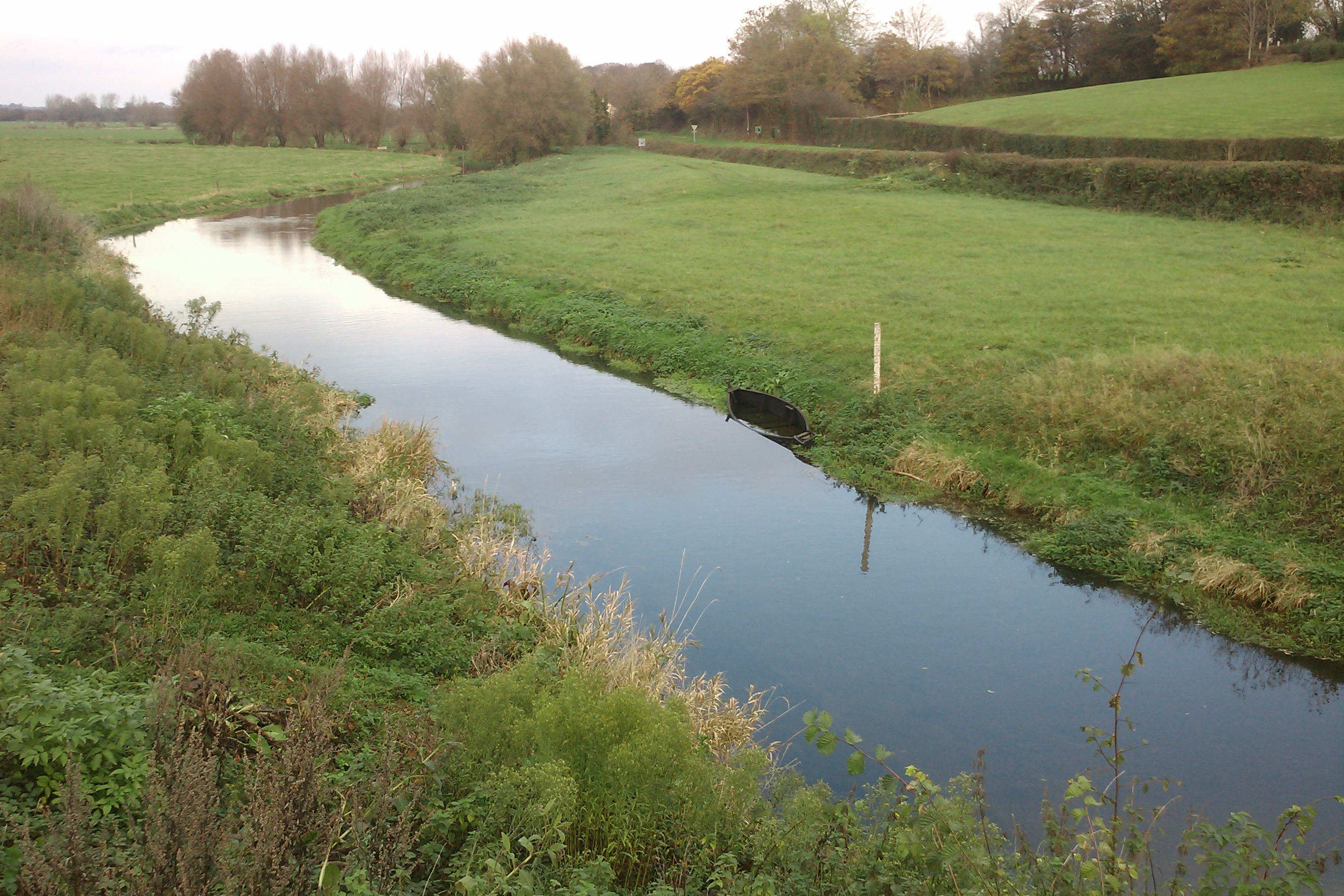

- Location within France Location within Normandy

Location
- Country: France

Physical characteristics
- Source
  - location: Normandy
- Mouth
  - location: Douve
  - coordinates: 49°21′48″N 1°21′16″W
- Length: 36 km (22 mi)

Basin features
- Progression: Douve→ English Channel

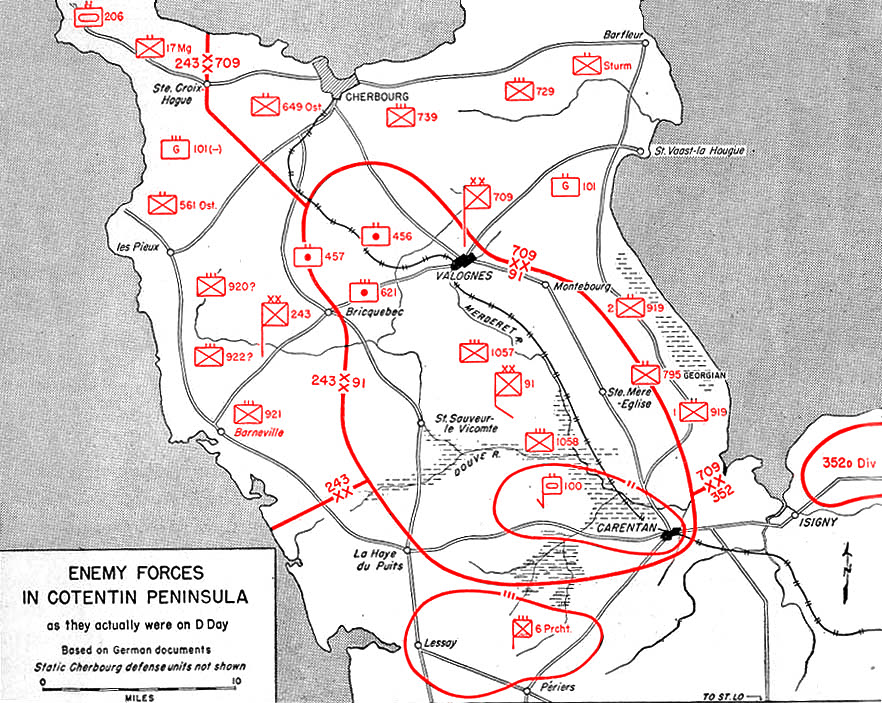
US Army map of the Cotentin peninsula in 1944, showing the Merderet

The Merderet is a 36.4-kilometre-long (22.6-mile) river in Normandy, France, which is a tributary to the river Douve. It runs roughly north-south down the middle of the Cotentin Peninsula from Valognes to the junction with the Douve at Beuzeville la Bastille.

== Hydrology ==
The river has relatively high turbidity and its brownish water is somewhat low in velocity due to the slight gradient of the watercourse; pH levels have been measured at 8.31 near the Chateau d'Isle Marie and electrical conductivity of the waters have tested at 61 microsiemens per centimetre. At this reference location, summer flows are typically around 7 m^{3}/s (250 cu ft/s).

== Airborne landings on D-Day ==
Running parallel to the shoreline about 8 kilometres (5 miles) from Utah Beach, the marshes of the Merderet and Douve formed a natural defensive line protecting the western end of the Allied landing zone and at the same time limiting the Allies' potential to break out of the beachhead. They had been flooded to further impede movement. Thus control of the bridges at Manoir de la Fière and Chef-du-Pont was seen as vital. The Merderet was assigned to the U.S. 82nd Airborne Division as Mission Boston, scheduled for 5 hours before the amphibious landings on D-Day.

Cloud cover and German fire caused the landings to be dispersed; the paratroopers took the strategic town of Sainte-Mère-Église but failed in their original mission to clear the west bank of the Merderet on D-Day and blow the bridge over the Douve at Pont l'Abbé (now Étienville). The extent of their control of the bridges over the Merderet is disputed, but it was sufficient to hold off German counterattacks. These included an attack over the causeway at La Fiere by the 1057th Grenadier Regiment and light tanks of the 100th Panzer Replacement Battalion. This appears to have been the inspiration for the climactic battle in the film Saving Private Ryan, which is set around a bridge over the Merderet in the fictional town of Ramelle.

After the Battle of Carentan on 9 June, Allied forces moved up the Cotentin Peninsula on either side of the Merderet. This advance culminated in the Battle of Cherbourg which saw the port captured by the end of the month.
