= Sainte-Mère-Église =

- Commune
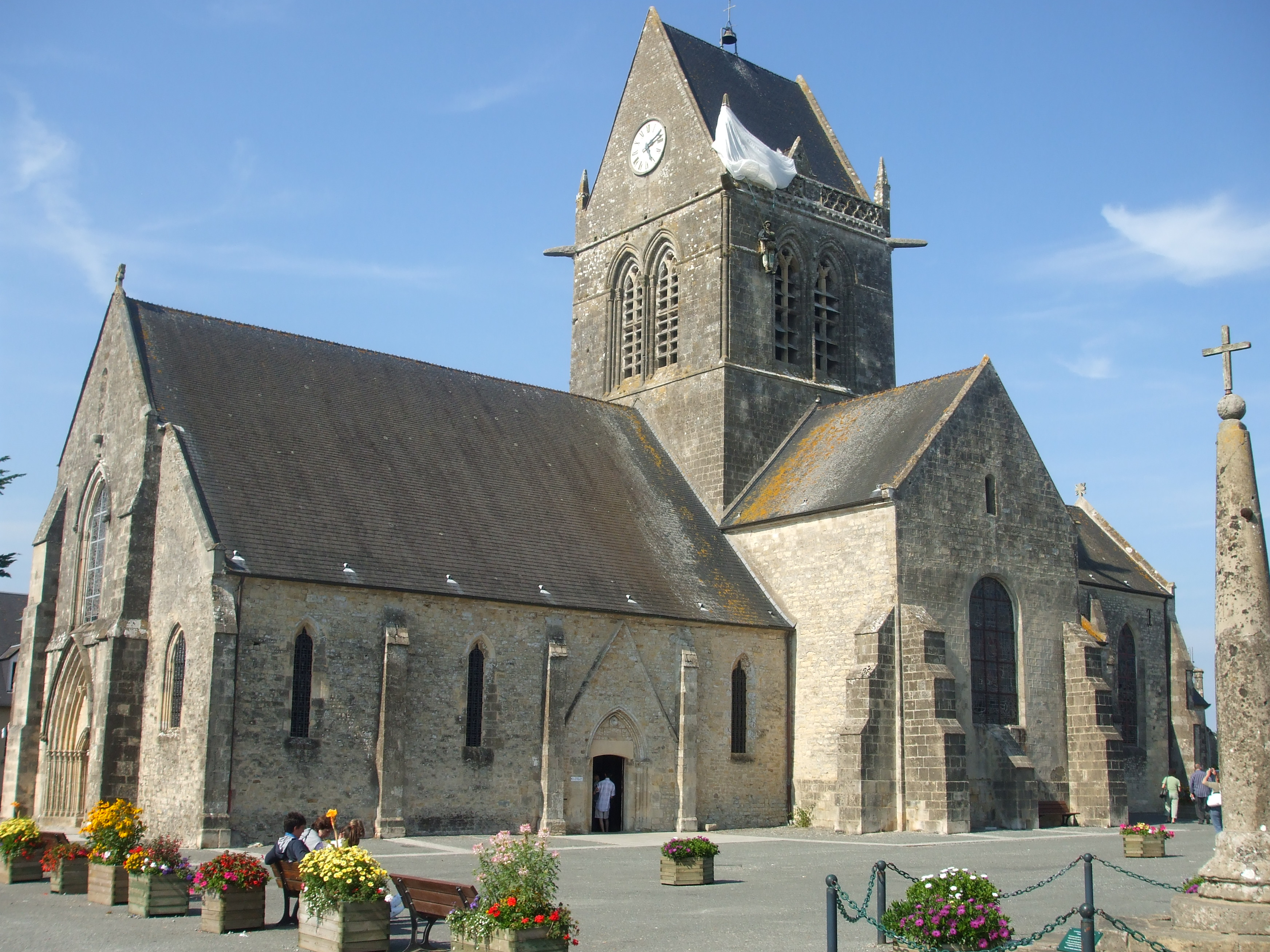
- Church with Parachute Memorial

- Coat of arms
- Location of Sainte-Mère-Église
- Location within France Location within Normandy
- Coordinates: 49°24′32″N 1°19′05″W
- Country: France
- Region: Normandy
- Department: Manche
- Arrondissement: Cherbourg
- Canton: Carentan-les-Marais
- Intercommunality: Baie du Cotentin

Government
  - Mayor (2020–2026): Alain Holley
- Area^{1}: 52.27 km^{2} (20.18 sq mi)
- Elevation: 34 m (112 ft)
- Highest elevation: 41 m (135 ft)
- Lowest elevation: 1 m (3.3 ft)
- Population (2023): 2,896
  - Density: 55.40/km^{2} (143.5/sq mi)
- Time zone: UTC+01:00 (CET)
  - Summer (DST): UTC+02:00 (CEST)
- INSEE/Postal code: 50523 /50480
- ^{1} French Land Register data, which excludes lakes, ponds, glaciers > 1 km^{2} (0.386 sq mi or 247 acres) and river estuaries.

Sainte-Mère-Église (French pronunciation: [sɛ̃t mɛʁ eɡliz]) is a commune in the northwestern French department of Manche, in Normandy. On 1 January 2016, the former communes of Beuzeville-au-Plain, Chef-du-Pont, Écoquenéauville and Foucarville were merged into Sainte-Mère-Église. On 1 January 2019, the former communes of Carquebut and Ravenoville were merged into Sainte-Mère-Église.

The commune is listed as a Village étape.

== Geography ==
Sainte-Mère-Église lies in a flat area of the Cotentin Peninsula known locally as le Plain (as opposed to the standard French term la plaine). The Plain is bounded on the west by the Merderet River and by the English channel to the east, and by the communes of Valognes and Carentan to the north and south, respectively. Besides Sainte-Mère-Église, the Plain's other major town is Montebourg, and its coast includes Utah Beach.

Although most of the Cotentin Peninsula belongs to the Armorican Massif, the Plain is part of the Paris Basin. Argillaceous limestone from the Sinemurian contributes to the region's dairy product appellation (AOC) Isigny-Sainte-Mère, which it shares with Bessin.

Horse breeding has long been practiced in the Plain, which is regarded as the cradle of the Anglo-Norman horse breed, the product of English stallions and mares from the Cotentin Peninsula.

== History ==
Founded in the eleventh century, the earliest records (1080–1082) include the Latin name Sancte Marie Ecclesia, meaning "Church of St. Mary", while a later document written in the local language, Norman, in 1317 mentions Saincte Mariglise. The current French form of the name means "Holy Mother Church".

The town was involved in the Hundred Years' War and the Wars of Religion.

=== D-Day battle ===
The town played a significant part in the World War II Normandy landings because of its position in the middle of route N13, which the Germans would have used to counterattack Allied landings on Utah and Omaha Beaches. In the early morning of 6 June 1944, mixed units of the U.S. 82nd Airborne and U.S. 101st Airborne Divisions occupied the town in Mission Boston, making it one of the first towns liberated in the invasion.

The early airborne landings, at about 1:40 a.m., resulted in heavy casualties. Some buildings in town caught fire that night, illuminating the sky, and making easy targets of the descending men. Some were killed by the fire. Many hanging from trees and utility poles were shot.

A well-known incident involved paratrooper John Steele of the 505th Parachute Infantry Regiment (PIR), whose parachute got caught on the tower roof and spire of the town church. He hung there for two hours, pretending to be dead until the Germans took him prisoner. Steele later escaped and rejoined his division when U.S. troops of the 3rd Battalion, 505th Parachute Infantry Regiment attacked the village, capturing 30 Germans and killing 11. The incident was portrayed in the movie The Longest Day by actor Red Buttons.

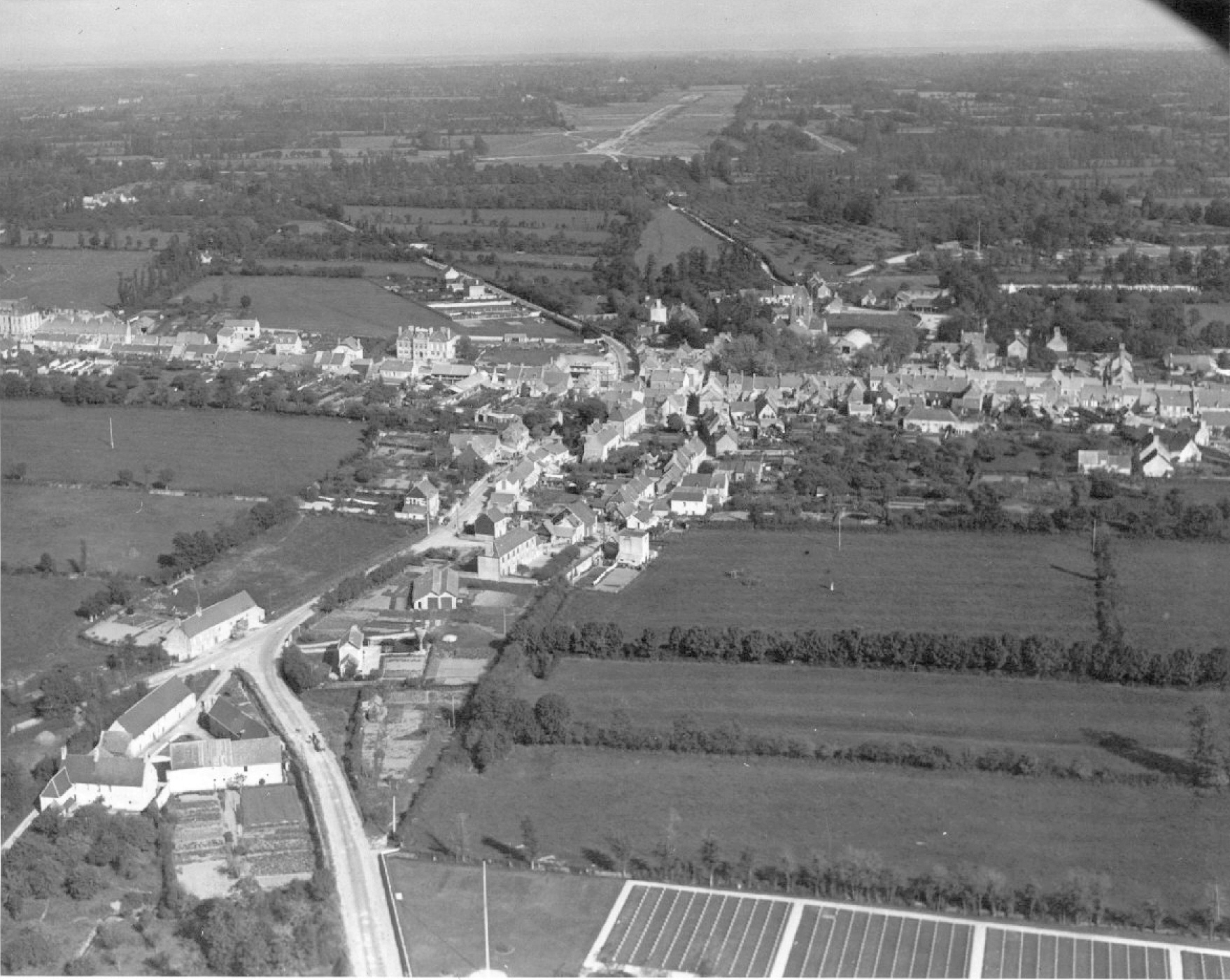
The village in 1944

At 5 a.m., a force led by Lieutenant Colonel Edward C. Krause of the 505th PIR took the town with little resistance. Allegedly, the German garrison was confused and had retired for the night. However, heavy German counterattacks began later in the day and into the next. The lightly armed troops held the town until reinforced by tanks from nearby Utah Beach in the afternoon of 7 June.

Krause and Lieutenant Colonel Benjamin H. Vandervoort received the Distinguished Service Cross for their actions during the capture of the town. Sgt. George Bowler Tullidge III received the Bronze Star; his parents would distribute A Paratrooper's Faith, a collection of Tullidge's letters home plus Bible verses, throughout the 82nd Airborne until 1995. 2nd Lt. Thomas J. Tighe of the 70th Tank Battalion was killed when his tank was hit by German artillery fire on the morning of June 7; he received the Silver Star posthumously.

Paratrooper Henry Langrehr crashed through a greenhouse roof, as retold in The Longest Day. On 6 November 2007, he received the Legion of Honour medal from the President of France, Nicolas Sarkozy, along with five other men.

=== Heraldry ===
blazon1	The arms of Sainte-Mère-Église are blazoned: Azure, a church Argent roofed Or charged with the capital letters A and M Sable, issuant from a base Gules charged with a léopard d'or; in chief 2 mullets Argent hanging from parachutes Argent. (On a blue background; a white/silver church, roofed with yellow/gold, marked with the capital letters A and M in black. The red base contains a yellow/gold lion walking to the left. At the top; two white/silver five-pointed stars hang from white/silver parachutes.)

== Population ==
Population data refer to the area corresponding with the commune as of January 2025.

Historical population
Year	Pop.	±% p.a.
1968	3,216	—
1975	3,220	+0.02%
1982	3,171	−0.22%
1990	3,160	−0.04%
1999	3,099	−0.22%
2007	3,158	+0.24%
2012	3,163	+0.03%
2017	3,077	−0.55%
2023	2,896	−1.01%
Source: INSEE

== Sights ==
Tourism in Sainte-Mère-Église today centres on its role in the D-Day invasion. There are many small museums (such as the Airborne Museum) and World War II-related gift shops and eating places. A dummy paratrooper hangs from the church spire, commemorating the story of John Steele.

Behind the church is a spring, believed by pilgrims to have healing powers, dedicated to Saint Mewan (Saint Méen).

Sainte-Mère-Église is twinned with the English village of Sturminster Marshall in Dorset.

== Gallery ==
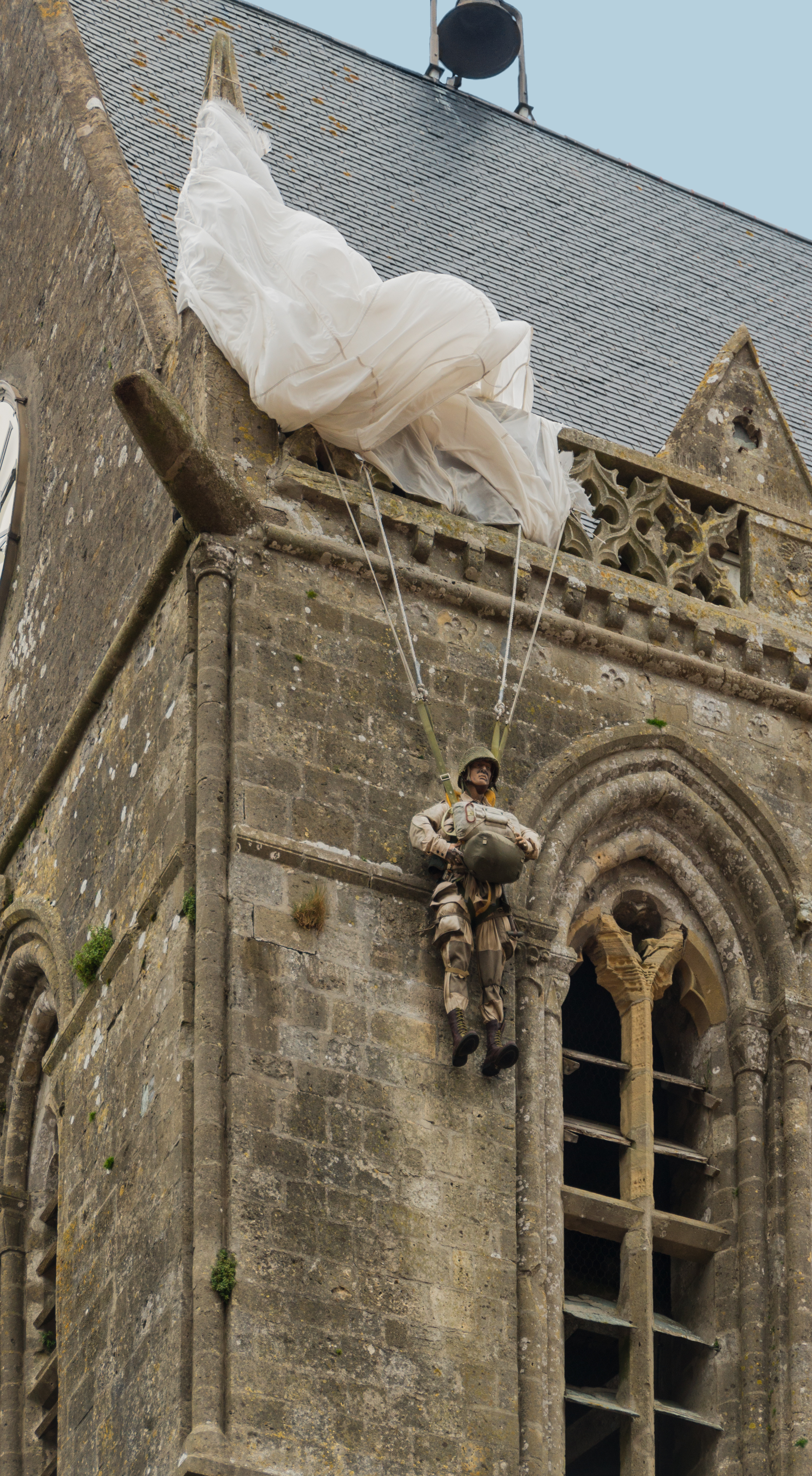
Parachute Memorial in Sainte-Mère-Église

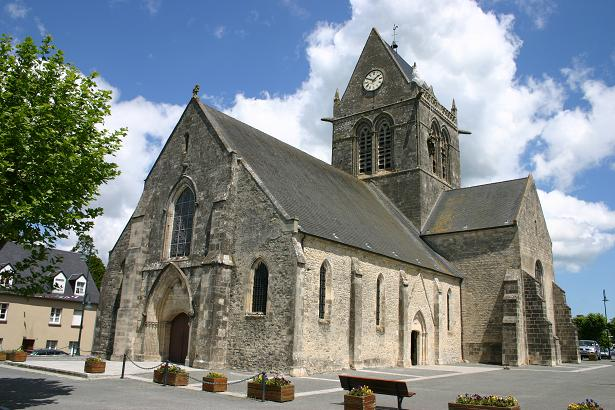
Sainte-Mère-Église Church.

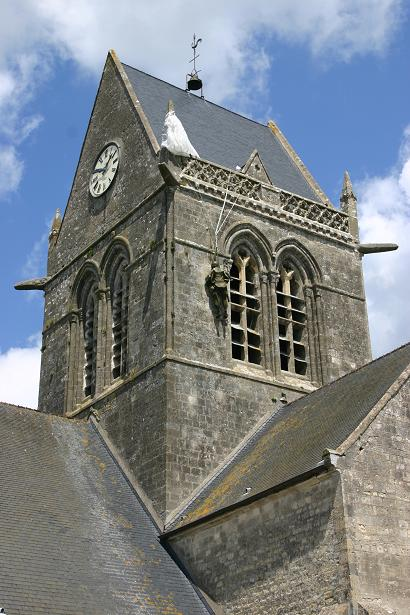
Church bell tower with dummy parachutist.

== Notable people ==
- William of Sainte-Mère-Église, Bishop of London from 1198 to 1221.
- Henri Basnage de Franquesnay (1615 in Sainte-Mère-Église - 1695), lawyer.
- François-Édouard Hasley (1825-1888), successively Bishop of Beauvais, Archbishop of Avignon, and then Archbishop of Cambrai.
- Félix Roumy (1861 in Sainte-Mère-Église - 1935), politician, President of the General Council of New Caledonia from 1925 to 1926.
- Paul Cirou (1869 in Sainte-Mère-Église - 1951), local painter from the d'Aigremont family.

== See also ==
- Communes of the Manche department
