= John Steele (paratrooper) =

US D-Day veteran and recipient of the Purple Heart medal

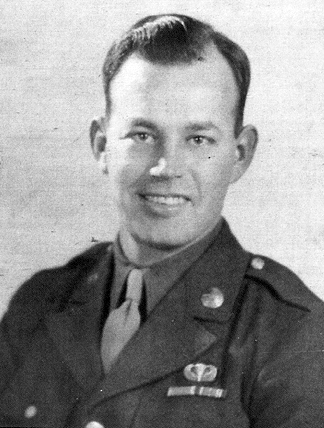
- Born: November 29, 1912; Metropolis, Illinois, U.S.
- Died: May 16, 1969 (aged 56); Fayetteville, North Carolina, U.S.
- Military career
- Allegiance: United States
- Branch: United States Army
- Rank: Private
- Units: 2nd Battalion, 505th Parachute Infantry Regiment, 82nd Airborne Division
- Conflicts: World War II: Operation Overlord
- Awards: Bronze Star; Purple Heart

Private John Marvin Steele (November 29, 1912 – May 16, 1969) was an American paratrooper who landed on the pinnacle of the church tower in Sainte-Mère-Église on June 6, 1944, during Operation Overlord.

== The operation ==
On the night before D-Day (June 6, 1944), American soldiers of the 82nd Airborne were parachuting into the area west of Sainte-Mère-Église in successive waves. The town had been the target of an aerial attack, during which a stray incendiary bomb had set fire to a house east of the town square. The church bell was rung to alert the town to the emergency, and townspeople turned out in large numbers to form a bucket brigade supervised by members of the German garrison. By 1:00 am, the town square was well lit and filled with German soldiers and villagers when two planeloads of paratroopers from the 1st and 2nd battalions, 505th Parachute Infantry Regiment, were dropped in error directly over the village.

The paratroopers were easy targets, and Steele was one of the few not killed. He was wounded in the foot by a burst of flak. His parachute caught in one of the steeple pinnacles of Our Lady of the Assumption Church (Église Notre-Dame-de-l'Assomption), leaving him hanging on the side of the church. Steele hung there limply for two hours, pretending to be dead, before the Germans took him prisoner. He escaped four hours later from the Germans and rejoined his division when US troops of the 505th's 3rd Battalion attacked the village, capturing 30 Germans and killing another 11. He was awarded the Bronze Star for valor and the Purple Heart for being wounded in combat.

== Later life ==
Though injured, Steele survived his ordeal. He continued to visit the town throughout his life and was an honorary citizen of Sainte-Mère-Église. The tavern, Auberge John Steele, stands adjacent to the square and maintains his legacy through photos, letters and articles hung on its walls.

Steele died of throat cancer on May 16, 1969, in Fayetteville, North Carolina. He was buried at the Masonic Cemetery in Metropolis, Illinois.

== Commemoration ==
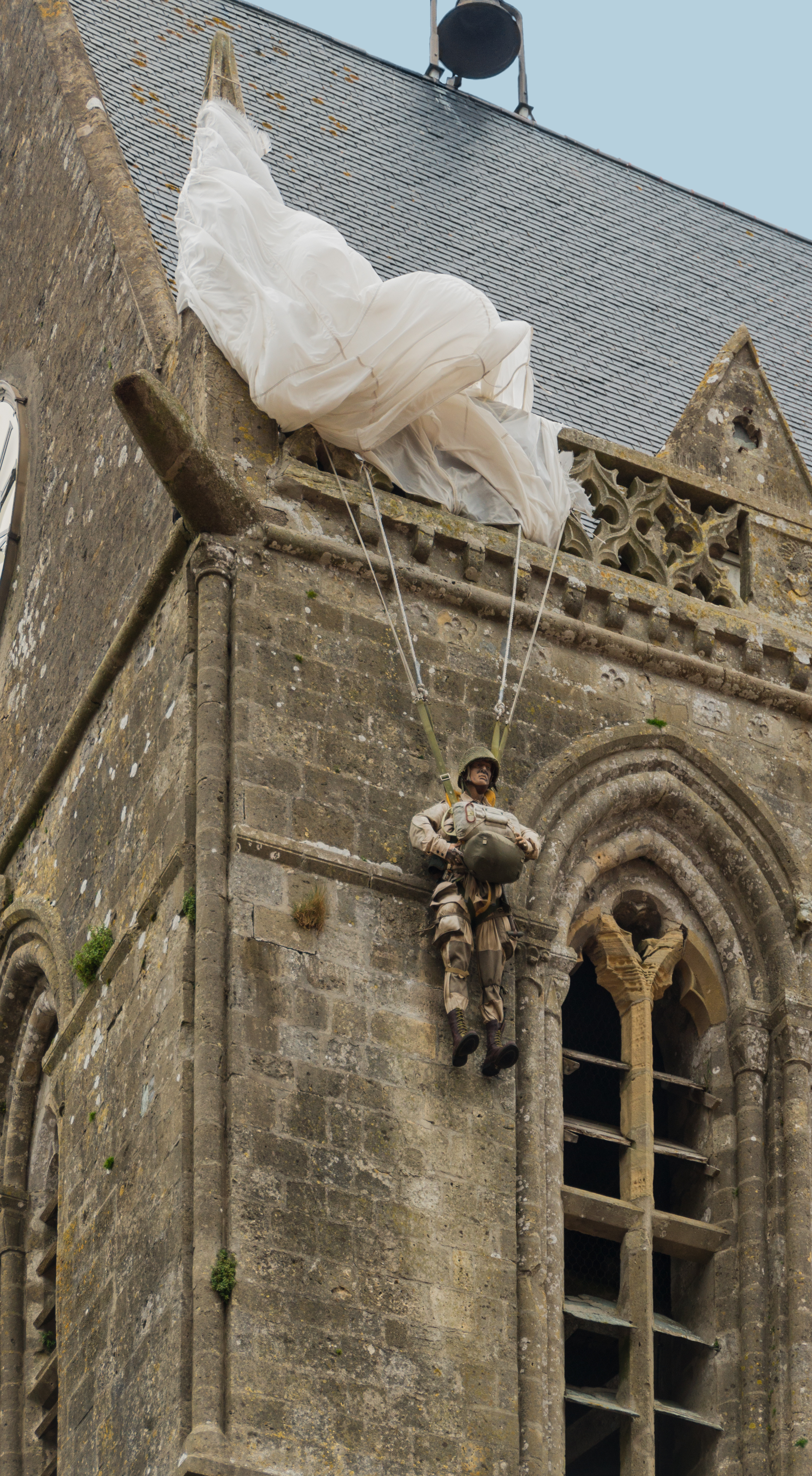
Monument to John Steele, whose parachute caught on a church pinnacle on D-Day

Today, these events are commemorated by the Airborne Museum (Sainte-Mère-Église) in Place du 6 Juin in the centre of Ste-Mère-Église and in the village church where a parachute with an effigy of Private Steele in his Airborne uniform hangs from the steeple. Pockmarks from gunfire are still visible in the church's stone walls. One of its stained glass windows depicts the Virgin Mary with paratroopers falling in the foreground.

== In popular culture ==
Steele is portrayed by Red Buttons in the film The Longest Day. He also appears in the first Call of Duty video game and is also honored in the game Hell Let Loose playing Sainte-Mère-Eglise scenario. Roaming the village the player can clearly see his parachute dangling down the top of the central church.
