= Robert P. Mathias =

In 1944, Lt. Robert P. Mathias was a platoon leader with the 508th Parachute Infantry Regiment (PIR) in the 82nd Airborne Division. He was the first American officer killed by German fire on D-Day. As Mathias stood ahead of his men at 0227 hours on D-Day, ready to parachute from his C-47 Dakota over the English Channel on its way to Normandy, he was mortally injured by a burst of enemy fire, but nevertheless managed to lead his team out of the plane.
