= Gourbesville =

- Part of Picauville
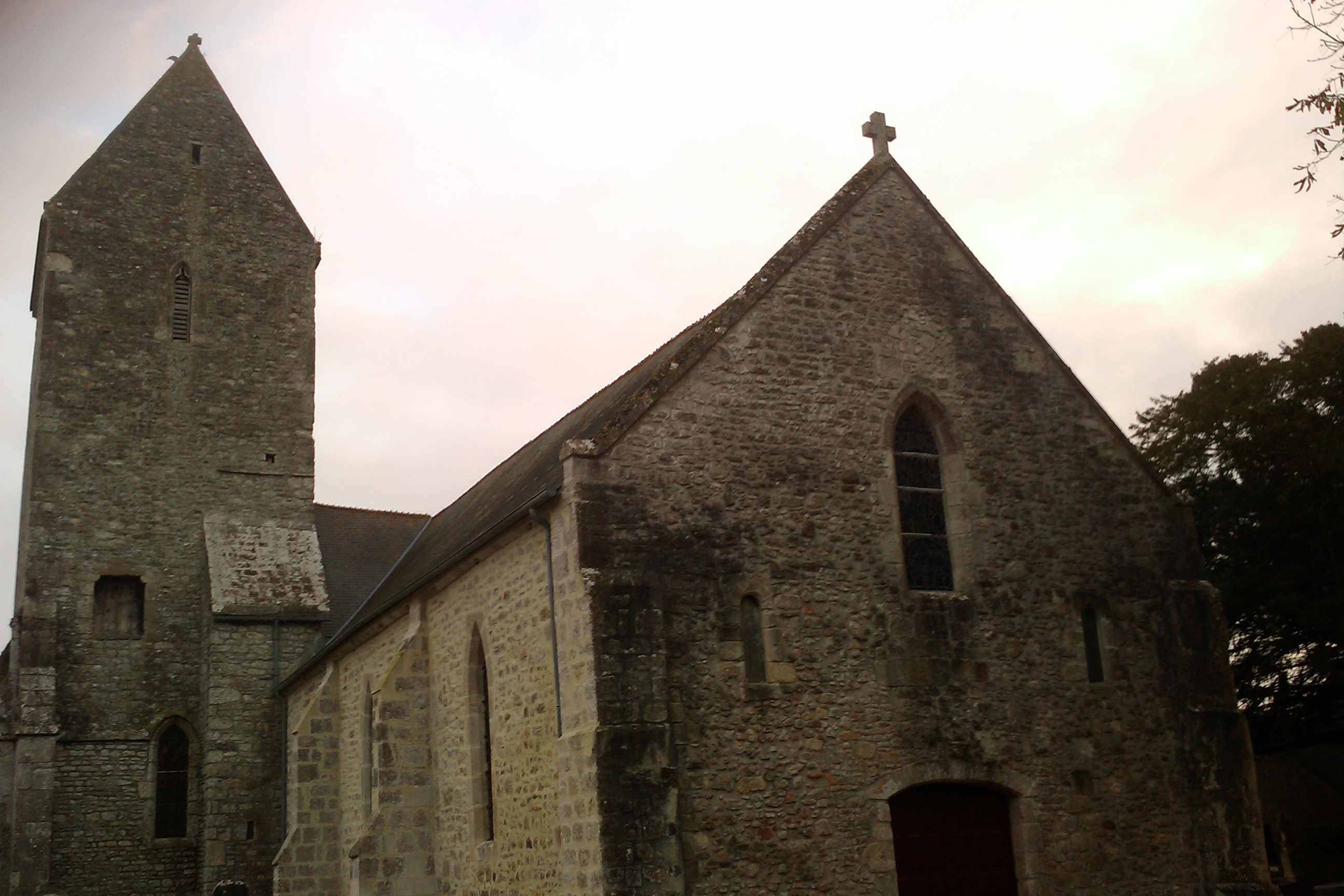
- The church of Saint-Ermeland
- Location of Gourbesville
- Location within France Location within Normandy
- Coordinates: 49°25′18″N 1°24′32″W
- Country: France
- Region: Normandy
- Department: Manche
- Arrondissement: Cherbourg
- Canton: Carentan
- Commune: Picauville
- Area^{1}: 8.18 km^{2} (3.16 sq mi)
- Elevation: 12 m (39 ft)
- Highest elevation: 31 m (102 ft)
- Lowest elevation: 3 m (9.8 ft)
- Population (2019): 166
  - Density: 20.3/km^{2} (52.6/sq mi)
- Time zone: UTC+01:00 (CET)
  - Summer (DST): UTC+02:00 (CEST)
- Postal code: 50480
- ^{1} French Land Register data, which excludes lakes, ponds, glaciers > 1 km^{2} (0.386 sq mi or 247 acres) and river estuaries.

Gourbesville (French pronunciation: [ɡuʁbəvil]) is a former commune in the Manche department in north-western France. On 1 January 2016, it was merged into the commune of Picauville.

== See also ==
- Communes of the Manche department
