= Douve =

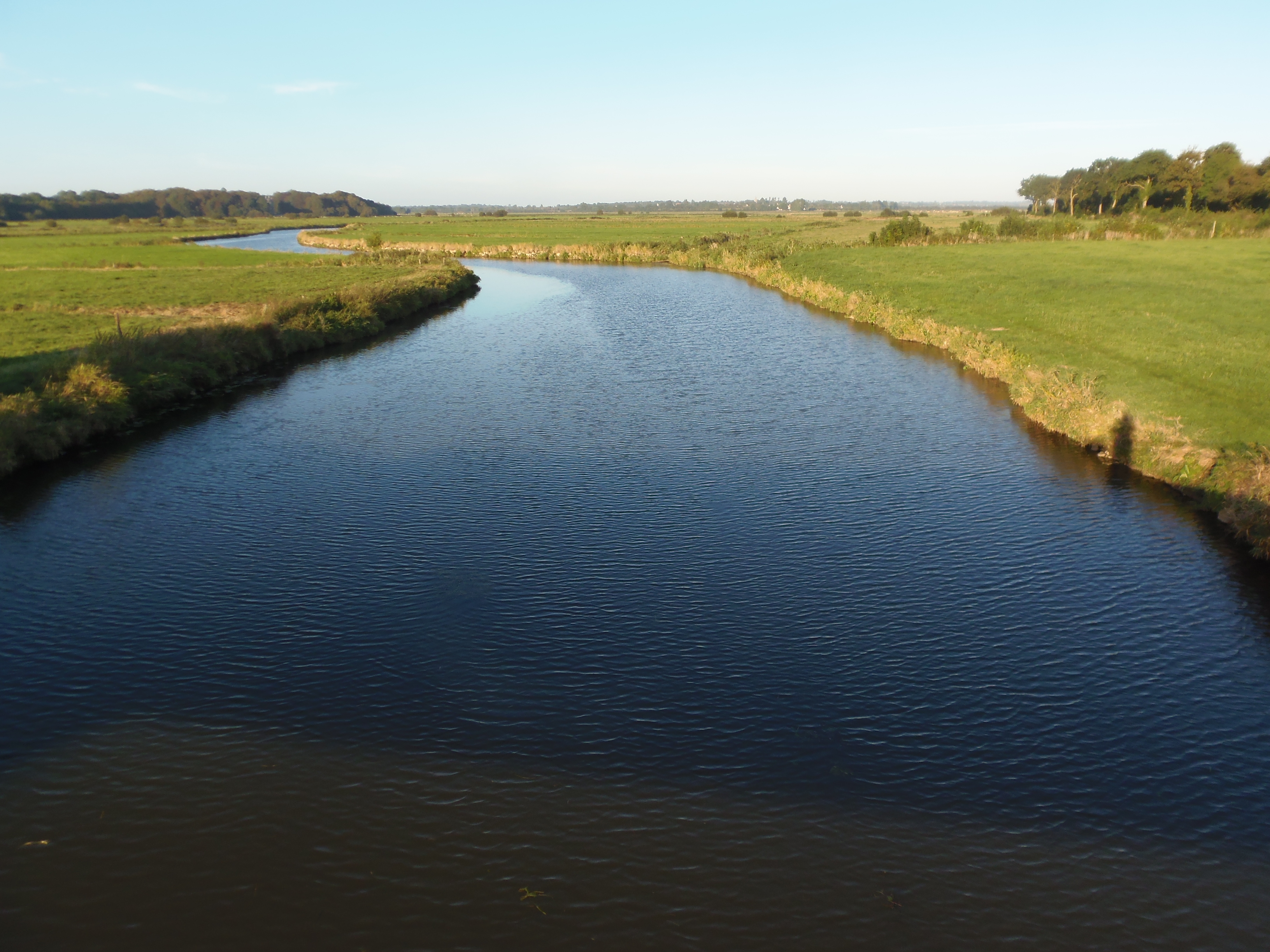

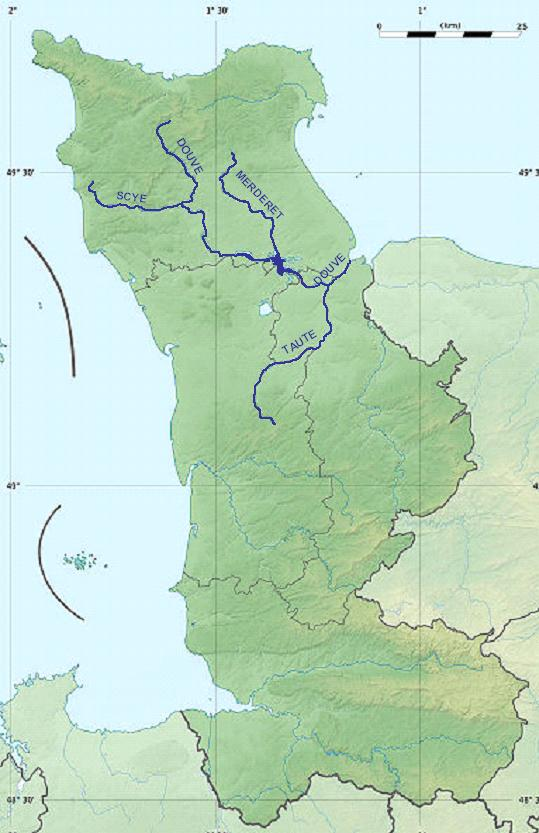

Location
- Country: France
- Region: Normandy

Physical characteristics
- Source
  - location: Manche
- Mouth: Bay of the Seine (English Channel)
  - coordinates: 49°21′32″N 1°10′10″W
- Length: 79 km (49 mi)

The Douve (French pronunciation: [duv]) or Ouve is a river, 78.6 km (48.8 mi) in length, which rises in the commune of Tollevast, near Cherbourg in the department of Manche. Ouve is considered its old name (Unva in ancient texts): Ouve appears to have been misspelled over the course of time as "Douve river" and then as "River of the Douve" (Douve literally means Ditch). The French name for this watercourse is la Douve.

After passing Tollevast, the river proceeds through the hills of the Cotentin Peninsula (Cherbourg peninsula) and goes by Sottevast, l'Étang-Bertrand and Magneville. It borders Néhou and crosses Saint-Sauveur-le-Vicomte. Once it reaches Bauptois, it alters its direction towards the Bay of the Seine in the south-eastern English Channel, passing through Carentan. The Douve is a navigable river owing to its flat bottom and adequate depth of flow.

In 1944 German troops, preparing Rommel's Fortress Europa, flooded the valley to prevent landing paratroops or gliders. On D-Day, the river was the boundary between the left flank of Allied landing forces on Utah Beach (on its left bank and so to the west nearest Rouen) and the bloody defensive battle that occurred at Omaha Beach. The Utah Beach landings were part of contingency planning only scheduled after ample landing craft became available and designed to give the Allies a leg up on taking a port city, in this case, Cherbourg, to bolster Allied logistical capacity. Had the landing craft been lacking, the river would have protected the exposed right flank of the allied invasion lodgement. With Utah in the plan, it was used to originate an offensive aimed squarely at the early domination of the peninsula and capture of Cherbourg and Caen (and eventually Rouen) at the opposite end of the lodgement. These cities were well protected by their German defenders.

Among those landing at the Douve was the demolition unit known as the Filthy Thirteen, whose exploits are said to have inspired the 1965 bestseller novel by E. M. Nathanson and the 1967 film The Dirty Dozen by Robert Aldrich.

== Hydrology ==
The Merderet is a tributary of the Douve.
