= Étienville =

- Commune
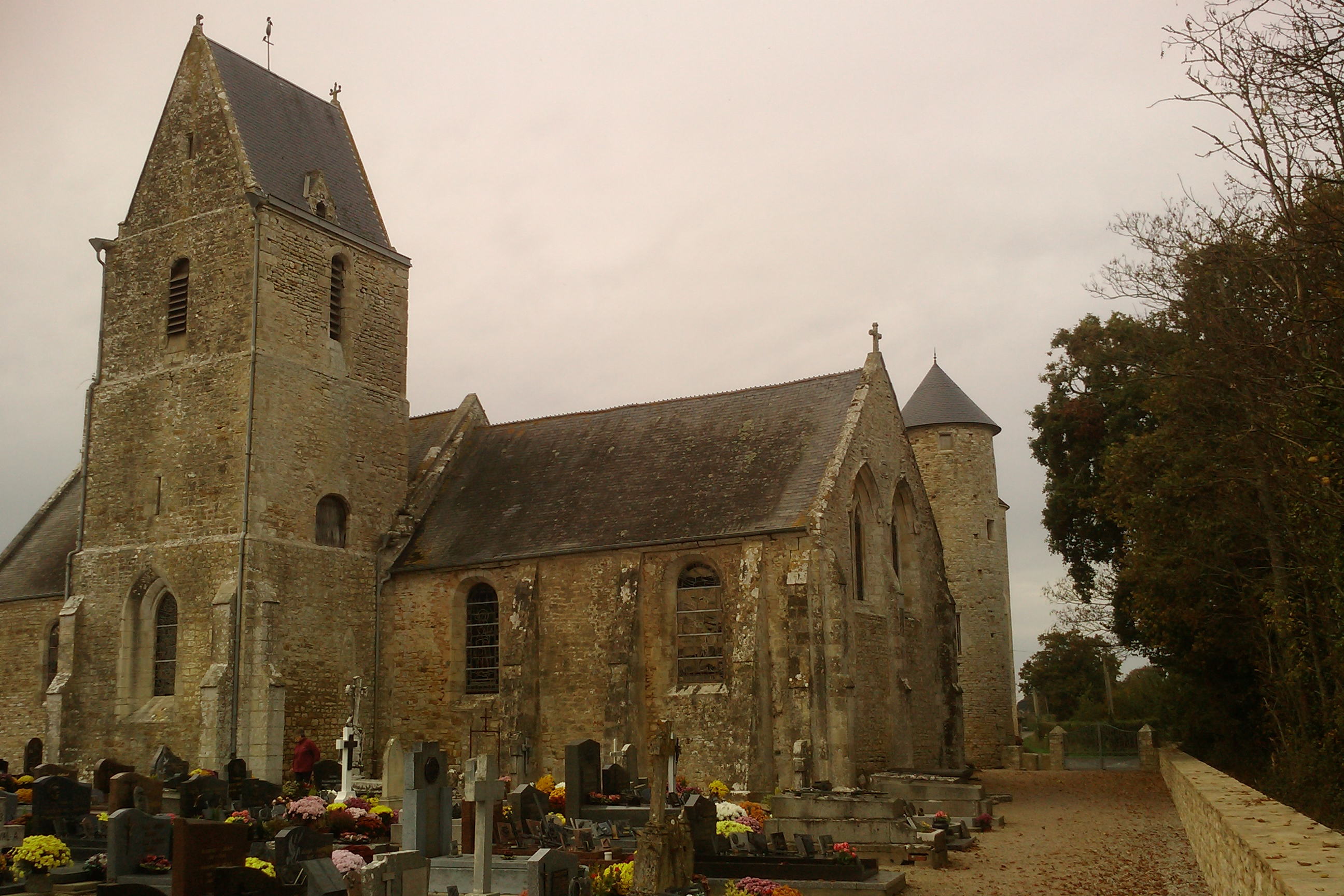
- St. George's Church

- Coat of arms
- Location of Étienville
- Location within France Location within Normandy
- Coordinates: 49°22′43″N 1°26′05″W
- Country: France
- Region: Normandy
- Department: Manche
- Arrondissement: Cherbourg
- Canton: Bricquebec-en-Cotentin
- Intercommunality: La Baie du Cotentin

Government
  - Mayor (2020–2026): Matthieu Giovannone
- Area^{1}: 7.36 km^{2} (2.84 sq mi)
- Elevation: 15 m (49 ft)
- Highest elevation: 30 m (98 ft)
- Lowest elevation: 2 m (6.6 ft)
- Population (2023): 368
  - Density: 50.0/km^{2} (129/sq mi)
- Time zone: UTC+01:00 (CET)
  - Summer (DST): UTC+02:00 (CEST)
- INSEE/Postal code: 50177 /50360
- ^{1} French Land Register data, which excludes lakes, ponds, glaciers > 1 km^{2} (0.386 sq mi or 247 acres) and river estuaries.

Étienville (French pronunciation: [etjɛ̃vil]) is a commune in the Manche department in Normandy in north-western France.

== See also ==
- Communes of the Manche department
