= Bruce B. G. Clarke =

Former US Army officer (born 1943)

Bruce B.G. Clarke
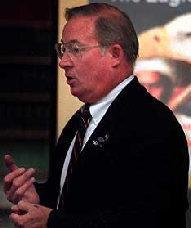
- Clarke addressing a group of telecom executives on the threat of terrorism
- Born: January 26, 1943 (age 83); Fort Benning, Georgia, U.S.
- Relatives: Arthur F. Gorham (father)
- Military career
- Allegiance: United States
- Branch: United States Army
- Service years: 1965–95
- Rank: Colonel
- Commands: 2nd Brigade; 2nd Squadron, 11th Armored Cavalry Regiment
- Conflicts: Vietnam War
- Awards: Legion of Merit; Meritorious Service Medal (4); Bronze Star Medal (V, 2); Army Commendation Medal (V, 2); Gallantry Cross (Vietnam)

Bruce Bennett Gorham Clarke (born January 26, 1943) is a former United States Army officer. Clarke is currently president of Bruce Clarke Consultants, Inc., a defense consulting firm. He is widely published on military and national security affairs, including in his book Expendable Warriors (2007) and in a regular column for the Examiner.

== Family ==
Clarke was born in Fort Benning, Georgia to Arthur F. Gorham and Corrine "Colonel" Bennett Gorham (later Clarke). After Gorham was killed leading paratroopers from the 505th Parachute Infantry Regiment during Operation Husky, the allied invasion of Sicily during World War II, Clarke's mother married Edwin R. Clarke, who adopted Clarke. Clarke's siblings are Dr. Richard Clarke and Cindy Clarke Carnahan.

Clarke married his wife Sue in 1969 after the two had met on a blind date during a golf tournament upon his return from Vietnam. While a graduate student at UCLA, the Clarkes appeared on the Newlywed Game winning a bedroom set. The Clarkes have three children, a daughter and two sons, and three grandsons and a new grand daughter.

== Education ==
Clarke attended public schools in Wichita, Kansas before winning a scholarship to Middlesex School in Concord, Massachusetts. Excelling both as a student and as an athlete, Clarke was accepted to both Stanford and Harvard but, to the surprise of many of his Ivy League-bound classmates, elected to attend the U.S. Military Academy at West Point.

In 1961, Clarke joined the Class of 1965 at West Point. While at West Point, Clarke was known for overloading on political science courses. He graduated third in his class in military history. Upon graduation in June 1965, Clarke received a commission as a second lieutenant in the cavalry.

Clarke holds a master of arts degree from the University of California, Los Angeles. He is a graduate of the Command and General Staff College and the National War College. Clarke was a member of MIT's Center for International Studies' Seminar II.

== Army career ==
Following Ranger and Airborne Schools, Clarke commanded a 160-man airborne cavalry troop in West Germany. From there he deployed to South Vietnam first as an assistant district advisor and then as a district advisor. Clarke fought in the Battle of Khe Sanh and later participated in both the planning for and retaking of the combat base.

=== Battle of Khe Sanh ===
In January 2013, Clarke used his Examiner column to recount his experiences at Khe Sanh and pay tribute to all those who fought there. What follows is the text of that article:

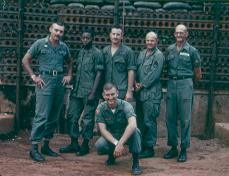
MACV Advisory Team 4 Huong Hoa District Team pictured L-R: MAJ Whitenack, SFC King, LT Clarke, SFC "Doc" Perry, SFC Humphries, and SP4 Gehrke (kneeling)

In Expendable Warriors: The Battle of Khe Sanh and the Vietnam War I argue that the US won the battle of Khe Sanh and lost the war at the very same time. There was a battle fought in Khe Sanh village on 21 and 22 January 1968 that very few people know about. Every military historian knows of the artillery barrages and the trenches that were the siege of the Khe Sanh Combat Base (KSCB), but what has been called the biggest ground battle of Khe Sanh took place when at 5 AM on 21 January 1968 the 66th Regiment, 304th North Vietnamese Army (NVA) Division launched an attack against the Hướng Hóa district Headquarters in Khe Sanh Village (about 4 km south of the Khe Sanh Combat Base).

The ensuing fight pitted a mixed force of six different groups (175 men) inside the compound against 2,000 men of the NVA force—the little band of warriors included:

- The District Staff of Vietnamese officers and men led by Captain Tinh A-Nhi
- An understrength Vietnamese Regional Force (RF) Company
- Two Montagnard manned Popular Force (PF) platoons
- The Marines of a Combined Action Platoon (CAP) led by SGT John Balanco and the company headquarters led by LT Tom Stamper
- The four man Army advisory team led by Captain Bruce Clarke
- A two man Army Intelligence unit called Joint Technical Advisory Detachment (JTAD) consisting of LT Jaime Taronji and SGT George Amos

The attack was from three directions with the main effort coming from the southwest against the RF Company. The weather was extremely poor with very heavy fog. The initial enemy assault was beaten off by the courageous efforts of the RF Company and by almost constant barrages of artillery using variable time fused rounds. After the initial assault was broken, the enemy simply backed off and using the positions he had already prepared, attempted to destroy the key bunkers by recoilless rifle and rocket propelled grenade fire. Simultaneously it moved into Khe Sanh village and setup mortars with which they attempted to shell the compound. At this time the police station was still communicating with the District Headquarters and made it possible to put effective fire on the enemy moving into the village. For the next four hours there were constant attacks or probes against the compound which were beaten off by the valiant efforts of Bru (Montagnard) PFs and the Vietnamese RFs working as a coordinated team and reinforced by the CAP Marines, which SGT Balanco moved to meet the threat.

At about 11:30 the fog burned off, during the next five hours there were three attempts to resupply the beleaguered garrison, which was in dire straits for ammunition. All during the afternoon CPT Ward Britt, an Air Force FAC, working out of Quang Tri put in numerous air strikes on the massed NVA who were trying to reorganize. On one of these airstrikes he put in two fighters on 100 NVA in the open and after it was over he could not see any movement, just bodies.

The night of 21 January the NVA were unable to make an attack and only sniped throughout the night. Captains Nhi and Clarke collaborated continually and estimated where the NVA would withdraw to. A B-52 strike was requested and it was later learned that the strike had hit the Regiment,

The next morning the evacuation of District Headquarters was ordered after Colonel David E. Lownds, the commander of the 26th Marine Regiment, ordered the evacuation of the Marines from the garrison and denied further artillery support—over 1200 rounds had been fired in the last 24 hours in support of the District Headquarters defense. The Marines and the wounded were evacuated by air. CPT Clarke and SFC King, two of the advisors, accompanied the District Forces who, using an unknown route, successfully escaped from the District Headquarters.

That afternoon CPT Clarke accompanied a Special Forces strike team that conducted a heliborne raid back into the District Headquarters to destroy everything that the District Forces had left behind and to evacuate the over 150 weapons that the District Forces had captured.

The District government, forces, and advisors spent the next two and a half months in exile at the KSCB where they dodged artillery rounds, took part in the defense of the Combat Base, and operated an intelligence net.

The siege of KSCB lasted for 76 more days. During that time the "agony of Khe Sanh” played on the front pages and news reports on Main Street thought out the country. The result was that while the battle of Khe Sanh was won (two NVA divisions were rendered combat ineffective) but the public relations battle and thus the war was lost.

Returning from South Vietnam, and recently married, Clarke moved to Los Angeles to attend the University of California, Los Angeles where he earned a master of arts degree. Because of a shortage of officers, Clarke was forced to leave UCLA before finishing his PhD for a teaching post in the Department of Social Sciences at West Point. Among his students at West Point was David H. Petraeus. Clarke next attended the Command and General Staff College at Fort Leavenworth, Kansas and then moved up through a variety of positions within the 1st Infantry Division at Fort Riley, Kansas.

In 1979, Clarke was tapped to join the Army Staff in the Office of the Deputy Chief of Staff for Operations and Plans in the Political-Military Division under future Joint Chiefs of Staff Chairman General John Shalikashvili, who had served on the same MACV advisory team in Vietnam. One of his first assignments was as a member of the Reagan-Carter presidential transition team. Clarke also worked on the ABM Treaty. In early 1982, he left the Pentagon to take command of the 2nd Squadron, 11th Armored Cavalry Regiment in Bad Kissingen, West Germany. Clarke and his troopers were responsible for over 150-km of the East-West German border in the Fulda Gap. During this period, the Squadron fielded both the M1 Abrams main battle tank and the M2 Bradley fighting vehicle.

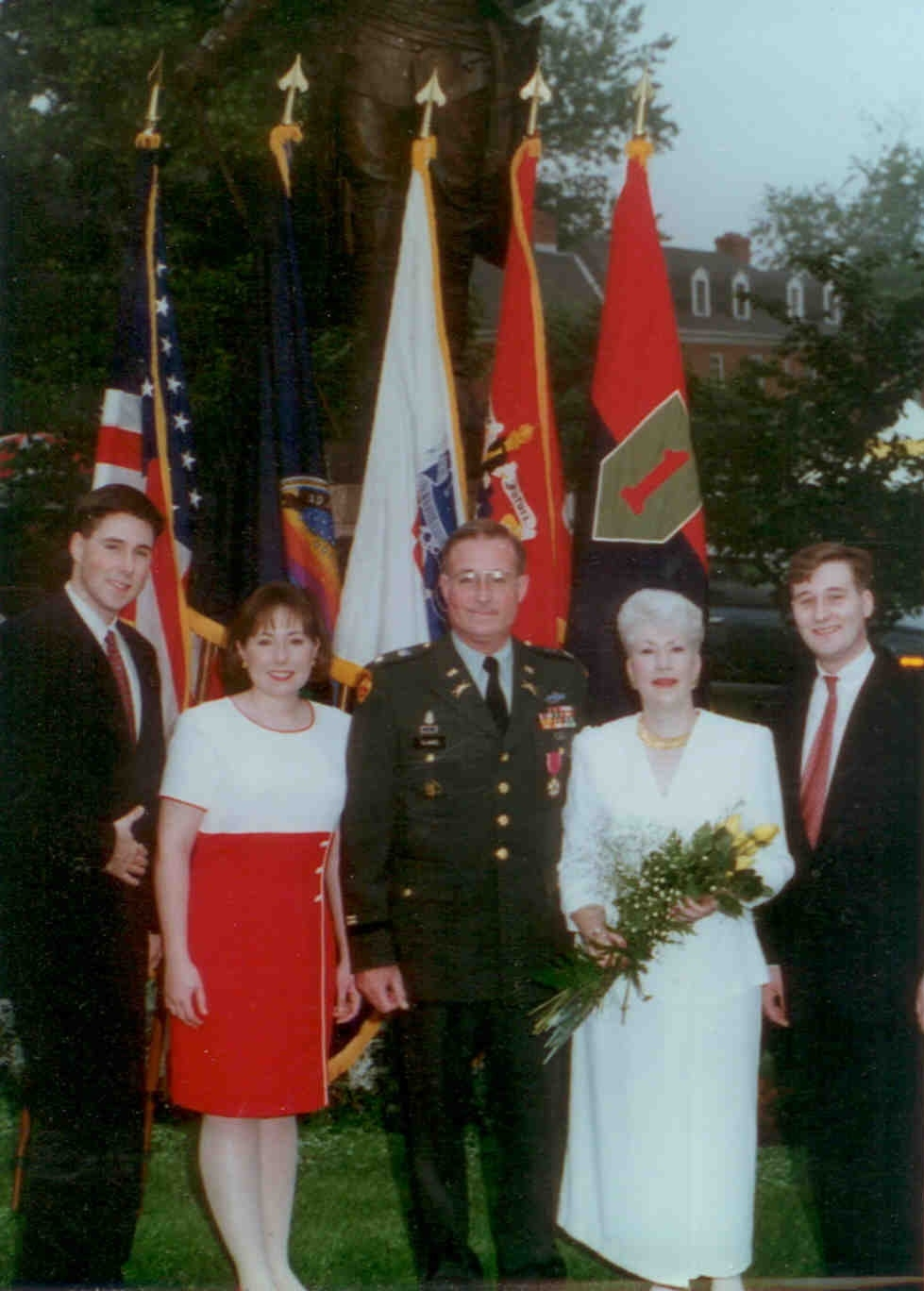
Clarke with his family at his retirement ceremony after being decorated with the Legion of Merit by Army Chief of Staff General Gordon Sullivan

Next, Clarke attended the National War College in Carlisle, Pennsylvania graduating with the class of 1985. From there he joined the Arms Control and Disarmament Agency inside the State Department working for Ambassador Ken Adelman. Clarke served as the senior military officer in arms control negotiations with the Soviet Union. After his first year at the State Department he was selected for brigade command but the busy pace of Soviet-American negotiations caused his assignment to be extended one year beyond the normal two-year posting. In his three years at the State Department, he regularly shuttled between negotiations in Washington and Geneva. This period included three summit meetings between President Ronald Reagan and Soviet premier Mikhail Gorbachev: the November 1985 Geneva Summit, the October 1986 Reykjavík Summit and the December 1987 Washington summit where the Intermediate-Range Nuclear Forces Treaty was signed.

In 1988, Clarke returned to the uniformed Army as commander of the 2nd Brigade, 1st Infantry Division at Fort Riley, Kansas. The brigade was composed of 2–16 Infantry Battalion, 3–37 Armor Battalion, and 4–37 Armor Battalion, plus supporting units and a battalion from the Minnesota National Guard. Clarke's training of the Dagger Brigade for desert combat would prove fortuitous as days after giving up command in 1990 to Colonel Tony Moreno, Iraqi forces overran Kuwait. The 2nd Brigade eventually helped lead the ground invasion during Operation Desert Storm capturing Safwan, the site of the cease fire talks between General Norman Schwarzkopf and Iraqi commanders. In recognition of his service to the armor community, in 1990 Clarke was inducted into the Order of Saint George, one of the U.S. Armor Association's highest honors. That same year, Kansas Governor Mike Hayden named Clarke an "honorary Kansan" apparently unaware that Clarke was a lifelong Kansan.

Clarke's final posting was as Director of National Security Studies at the National War College. While at the Army War College he published extensively on military modernization and helped shape the work on conflict termination studies. In late-1992 this work was put to the test when, following President George H. W. Bush's deployment of forces to Somalia for Operation Restore Hope, Clarke led a team to consult with the Joint Chiefs of Staff on building an exit strategy. The military and political bureaucracies rejected their advice and failed to establish a coherent policy to guide the withdrawal of forces. The U.S. was further drawn into the conflict before President Bill Clinton pulled troops out after the Battle of Mogadishu and the Blackhawk down incident. Clinton and his Secretary of Defense Leslie Aspin were roundly criticized for also failing to establish an exit strategy. For his work at the Army War College, Clarke was awarded the General Dwight D. Eisenhower Chair in National Security in 1994. In 1995, following 30-years on active duty, Clarke retired. Army Chief of Staff General Gordon R. Sullivan presided over the ceremony and awarded Clarke the Legion of Merit.

== Post-Army career ==
Following his retirement from the Army, Clarke was the Training Manager at the Royal Saudi Land Forces Armored Institute in Tabuk, Saudi Arabia training Saudi armor officers and soldiers on the M1A2 main battle tank. After the Gulf War, the Saudis purchased 315 M1 tanks, enough to outfit a full armored division (or two mechanized infantry divisions). In 1998 Clarke returned to the U.S. and joined QuVis, a start-up technology company, where he helped them develop their military and government business.

In 2000, Clarke founded Bruce Clarke Consultants, Inc. to work with defense contractors on technology integration issues. Since 2005 he has also served as an advisor to Rockhill Partners, a venture capital partnership. His work on defense issues, national security strategy and knowledge of the Middle East has led to his advising at least two members of the U.S. Senate. He also drew upon his experience during the Carter-Reagan presidential transition as a paid advisor to incoming Kansas Governor Bill Graves.

== Publications ==
Clarke is the author of Expendable Warriors (Praeger Security International, 2007) with a foreword by former Joint Chiefs Chairman General John Vessey. He is also the author of Conflict Termination: A Rational Model (Strategic Studies Institute, U.S. Army War College, 1992). He was a contributor to Managing Contemporary Conflict: Pillars of Success edited by Max G. Manwaring and William J. Olson (Westview Press, 1996) and Maneuver Warfare Anthology, edited by Richard D. Hooker, Jr. (The Presidio Press, 1993).

In addition to a regular column for the Examiner he began writing in July 2009, Clarke has authored numerous publications for military audiences having been published in the Army Times, Armor, the Joint Forces Journal, Military Review, Infantry, Field Artillery and the Journal of Conflict and Terrorism. Clarke has also been published in The Washington Post, The Baltimore Sun, and The Topeka Capital-Journal.
