= Bellevue, Ohio =

- City
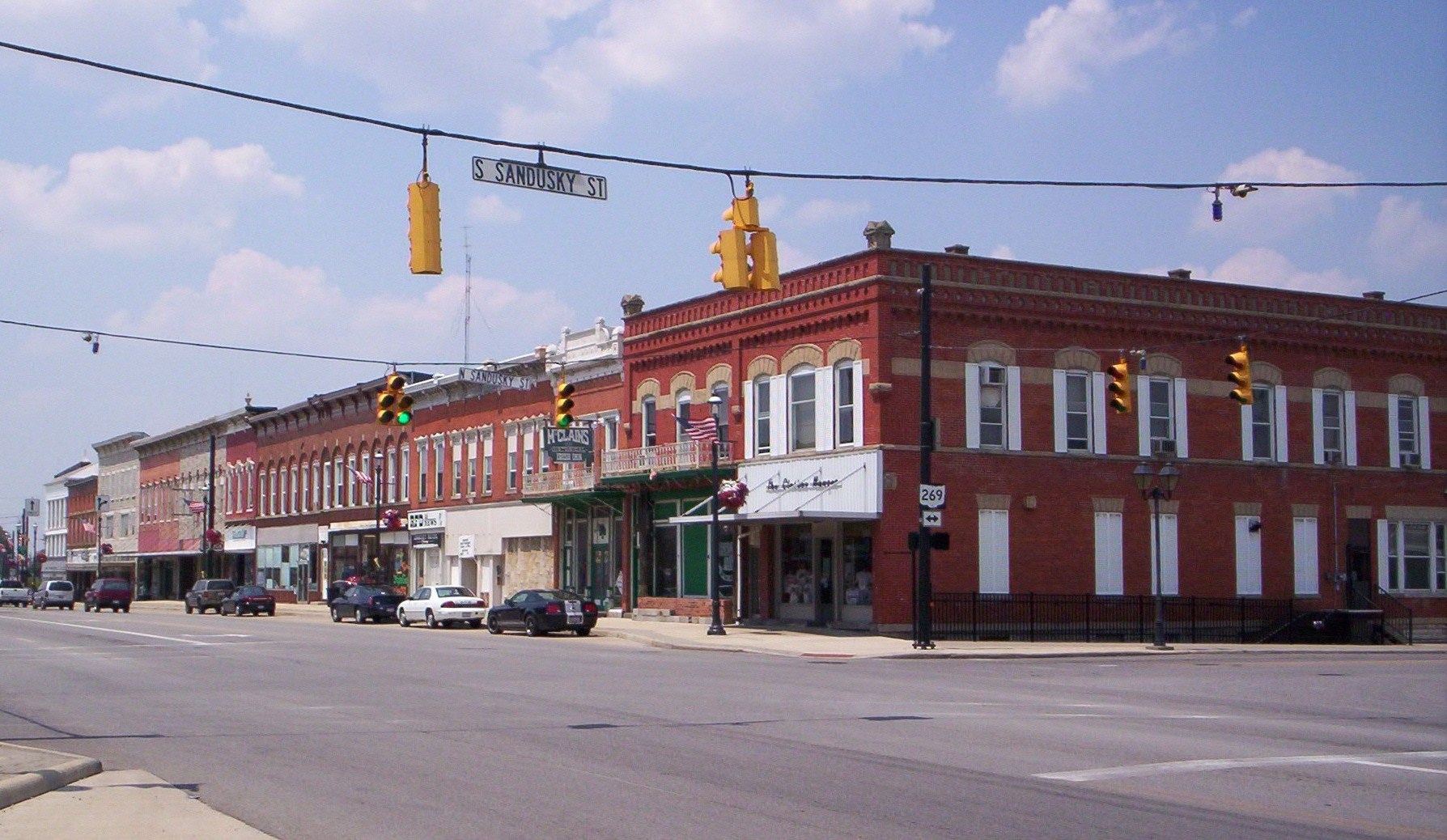
- East Main Street, downtown
- Motto: "Enjoy the 'Vue!"
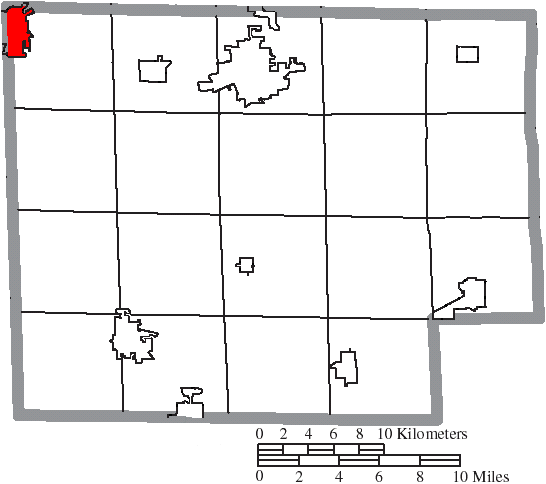
- Location of Bellevue in Huron County

- Location within Ohio Location within the United States
- Coordinates: 41°16′53″N 82°51′32″W
- Country: United States
- State: Ohio
- Counties: Seneca, Erie, Huron, Sandusky

Government
  - Mayor: Kevin Strecker

Area
  - Total: 6.25 sq mi (16.18 km^{2})
  - Land: 6.13 sq mi (15.87 km^{2})
  - Water: 0.12 sq mi (0.31 km^{2})
- Elevation: 751 ft (229 m)

Population (2020)
  - Total: 8,249
  - Estimate (2023): 8,164
  - Density: 1,346.4/sq mi (519.83/km^{2})
- Time zone: UTC-5 (Eastern (EST))
  - Summer (DST): UTC-4 (EDT)
- ZIP code: 44811
- Area codes: 419, 567
- FIPS code: 39-05228
- GNIS feature ID: 1086341
- Website: thenewcityofbellevue.com

Bellevue (/ˈbɛlvjuː/ BEL-vew) is a city in Erie, Huron, Seneca, and Sandusky counties in the U.S. state of Ohio, located 61 miles southwest of Cleveland and 45 miles southeast of Toledo. The population was 8,249 at the 2020 census. The National Arbor Day Foundation has designated Bellevue as a Tree City USA.

The Sandusky County portion of Bellevue is part of the Fremont Micropolitan Statistical Area, while the Huron County portion is part of the Norwalk Micropolitan Statistical Area. The small portion of the city that extends into Erie county is part of the Sandusky Micropolitan Statistical Area.

== History ==
The city derives its name from James H. Bell, a railroad official.

Bellevue was the home of Henry Morrison Flagler when he partnered up with John D. Rockefeller to start Standard Oil. Flagler later went on to build the Florida Overseas Railroad, to Key West, Florida. The property of his former Bellevue residence on Southwest Street is the current location of the Mad River & NKP Railroad Museum.

=== National Register of Historic Places ===
Bellevue and the surrounding countryside are home to three sites listed on the National Register of Historic Places: the Heter Farm, the John Wright Mansion, and the Tremont House.

== Geography ==
According to the 2010 census, the city has a total area of 6.25 square miles (16.2 km^{2}), of which 6.14 square miles (15.9 km^{2}) (or 98.24%) is land and 0.12 square miles (0.31 km^{2}) (or 1.92%) is water.

== Demographics ==
Historical population
| Census | Pop. | Note | %± |
|---|---|---|---|
| 1860 | 785 | | — |
| 1870 | 1,219 | | 55.3% |
| 1880 | 2,169 | | 77.9% |
| 1890 | 3,052 | | 40.7% |
| 1900 | 4,101 | | 34.4% |
| 1910 | 5,209 | | 27.0% |
| 1920 | 5,776 | | 10.9% |
| 1930 | 6,256 | | 8.3% |
| 1940 | 6,127 | | −2.1% |
| 1950 | 7,406 | | 20.9% |
| 1960 | 8,800 | | 18.8% |
| 1970 | 10,423 | | 18.4% |
| 1980 | 9,806 | | −5.9% |
| 1990 | 9,085 | | −7.4% |
| 2000 | 8,193 | | −9.8% |
| 2010 | 8,202 | | 0.1% |
| 2020 | 8,249 | | 0.6% |
| 2023 (est.) | 8,164 | | −1.0% |

=== 2020 census ===
As of the 2020 census, Bellevue had a population of 8,249. The median age was 39.1 years. 24.0% of residents were under the age of 18 and 18.2% of residents were 65 years of age or older. For every 100 females there were 95.7 males, and for every 100 females age 18 and over there were 91.8 males age 18 and over.

98.8% of residents lived in urban areas, while 1.2% lived in rural areas.

There were 3,403 households in Bellevue, of which 30.9% had children under the age of 18 living in them. Of all households, 43.1% were married-couple households, 20.2% were households with a male householder and no spouse or partner present, and 28.2% were households with a female householder and no spouse or partner present. About 31.1% of all households were made up of individuals and 13.1% had someone living alone who was 65 years of age or older.

There were 3,701 housing units, of which 8.1% were vacant. Among occupied housing units, 64.4% were owner-occupied and 35.6% were renter-occupied. The homeowner vacancy rate was 1.7% and the rental vacancy rate was 7.0%.

Racial composition as of the 2020 census
| Race | Number | Percent |
|---|---|---|
| White | 7,528 | 91.3% |
| Black or African American | 55 | 0.7% |
| American Indian and Alaska Native | 18 | 0.2% |
| Asian | 20 | 0.2% |
| Native Hawaiian and Other Pacific Islander | 1 | <0.1% |
| Some other race | 108 | 1.3% |
| Two or more races | 519 | 6.3% |
| Hispanic or Latino (of any race) | 423 | 5.1% |

=== 2010 census ===
As of the census of 2010, there were 8,202 people, 3,296 households, and 2,148 families living in the city. The population density was 1,335.8 inhabitants per square mile (515.8/km^{2}). There were 3,662 housing units at an average density of 596.4 per square mile (230.3/km^{2}). The racial makeup of the city was 96.3% White, 0.6% African American, 0.2% Native American, 0.2% Asian, 0.7% from other races, and 2.0% from two or more races. Hispanic or Latino of any race were 3.2% of the population.

There were 3,296 households, of which 34.5% had children under the age of 18 living with them, 46.9% were married couples living together, 12.9% had a female householder with no husband present, 5.4% had a male householder with no wife present, and 34.8% were non-families. 29.8% of all households were made up of individuals, and 12.5% had someone living alone who was 65 years of age or older. The average household size was 2.45 and the average family size was 3.01.

The median age in the city was 36.5 years. 26% of residents were under the age of 18; 8.5% were between the ages of 18 and 24; 26.6% were from 25 to 44; 24.3% were from 45 to 64; and 14.5% were 65 years of age or older. The gender makeup of the city was 47.9% male and 52.1% female.

=== 2000 census ===
As of the census of 2000, there were 8,193 people, 3,332 households, and 2,242 families living in the city. The population density was 1,619.8 inhabitants per square mile (625.4/km^{2}). There were 3,559 housing units at an average density of 703.6 per square mile (271.7/km^{2}). The racial makeup of the city was 97.77% White, 0.27% African American, 0.15% Native American, 0.27% Asian, 0.82% from other races, and 0.73% from two or more races. Hispanic or Latino of any race were 2.56% of the population.

There were 3,332 households, out of which 32.8% had children under the age of 18 living with them, 53.2% were married couples living together, 10.4% had a female householder with no husband present, and 32.7% were non-families. 27.6% of all households were made up of individuals, and 12.4% had someone living alone who was 65 years of age or older. The average household size was 2.46 and the average family size was 3.01.

In the city the population was spread out, with 26.5% under the age of 18, 8.3% from 18 to 24, 29.1% from 25 to 44, 21.5% from 45 to 64, and 14.6% who were 65 years of age or older. The median age was 36 years. For every 100 females, there were 93.1 males. For every 100 females age 18 and over, there were 88.6 males.

The median income for a household in the city was $88,100, and the median income for a family was $98,173. Males had a median income of $76,601 versus $44,189 for females. The per capita income for the city was $58,932. About 1.3% of families and 2.8% of the population were below the poverty line, including 1.5% of those under age 18 and 1% of those age 65 or over.

== Infrastructure ==
=== Roads ===
Bellevue is located on U.S. Route 20, which forms East and West Main Street. State Routes 18, 269, and 113 also run through the city. There is no public transportation, such as passenger buses or taxis. Bellevue is also served by the Ohio Turnpike via U.S. Route 20 and State Route 4.

=== Railroad ===
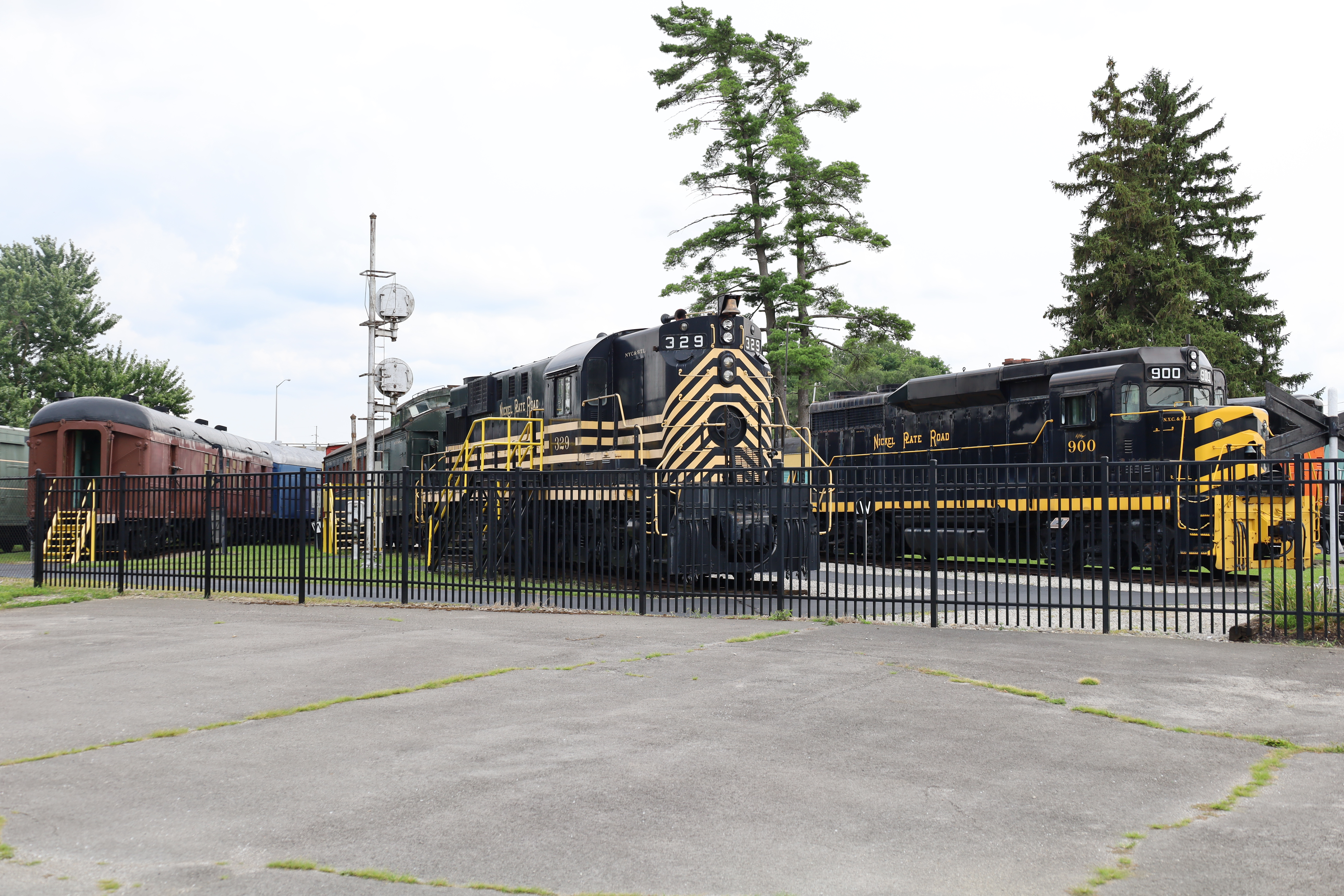
The Mad River & NKP Railroad Museum in 2023

During the first half of the 20th century, Bellevue was a busy railroad hub of the Nickel Plate Road, and it remains today as a hub for the Norfolk Southern Railway, which operates a massive railroad yard in Bellevue. From Bellevue, Norfolk Southern Lines extend northeast to Cleveland, north to Sandusky, northwest to Toledo, west to Fort Wayne, Indiana and south to Columbus. Also, the Wheeling and Lake Erie Railway operates a line from Bellevue that extends east to Pittsburgh, Pennsylvania.

== Media ==
Bellevue and the surrounding area was served by a daily newspaper, The Bellevue Gazette. The Gazette closed in June 2016, and is no longer in operation.

== Notable people ==
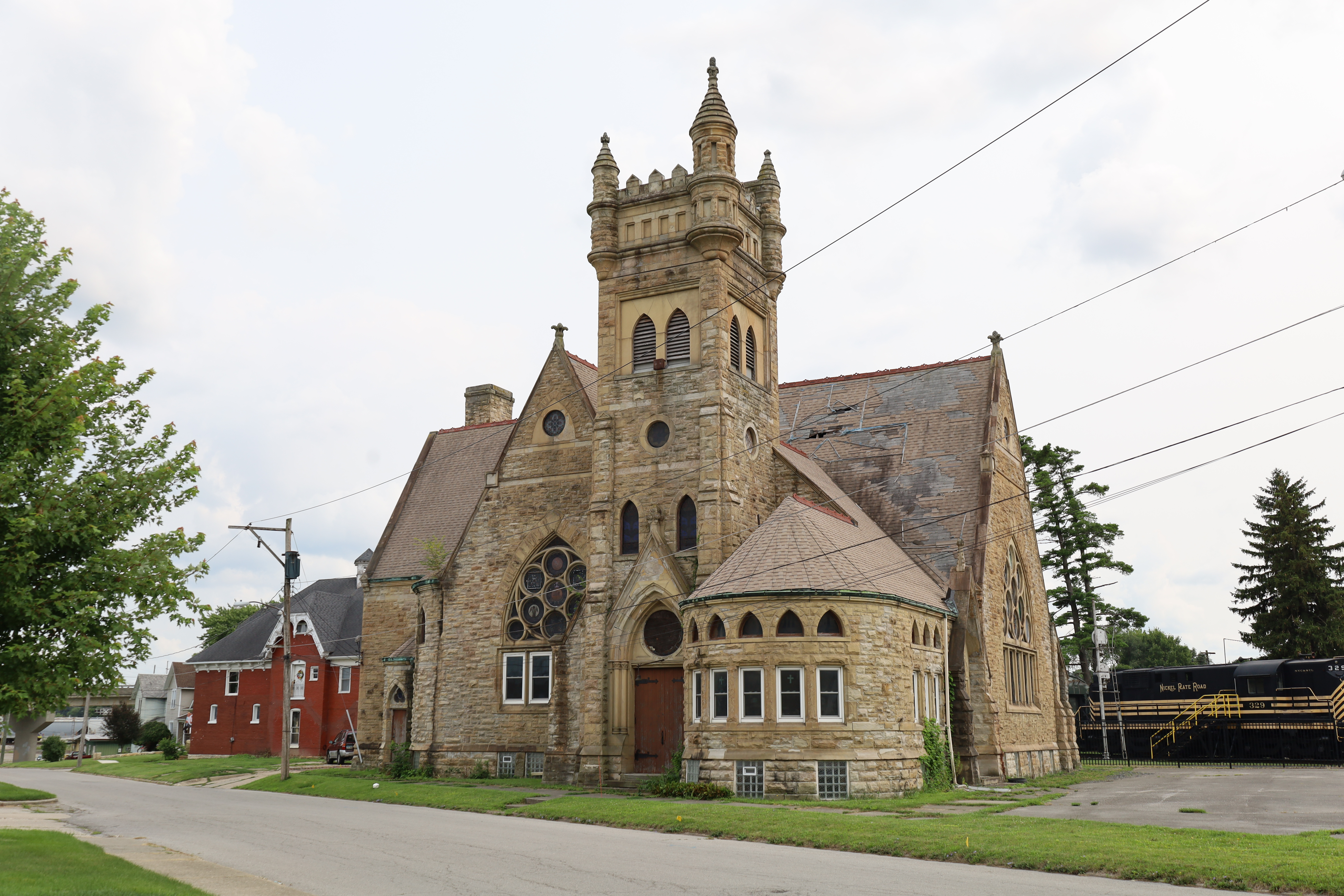
Former Harkness Memorial United Church of Christ Congregational in 2023

- Henry Flagler, Standard Oil tycoon, developer of Eastern Florida and "Father of Miami"
- Mildred Gillars (A.K.A. Axis Sally), radio personality during World War II
- Arthur F. Gorham, Commander of the 1st Battalion, 505th Parachute Infantry Regiment during World War II
- John Greenslade, Vice Admiral and Commander of the Pacific-Southern Naval Coastal Frontier during World War II
- Daniel M. Harkness, half brother of Henry Flagler and his son William L. Harkness, investors in Standard Oil
- Stephen V. Harkness, invested as a silent partner in the founding of Standard Oil.
- Benny LaPresta, NFL professional football player
- Amos Northup, automotive designer
- Christi Paul, CNN reporter and anchor
- Bradbury Robinson, threw the first forward pass in American football history
- Esther Shaw, Maine politician
- Brad Snyder, outfielder for Chicago Cubs.
- Howard L. Vickery, Rear Admiral, Vice Chairman U.S. Maritime Commission during World War II
