= William T. Ryder =

United States Army general (1913–1992)

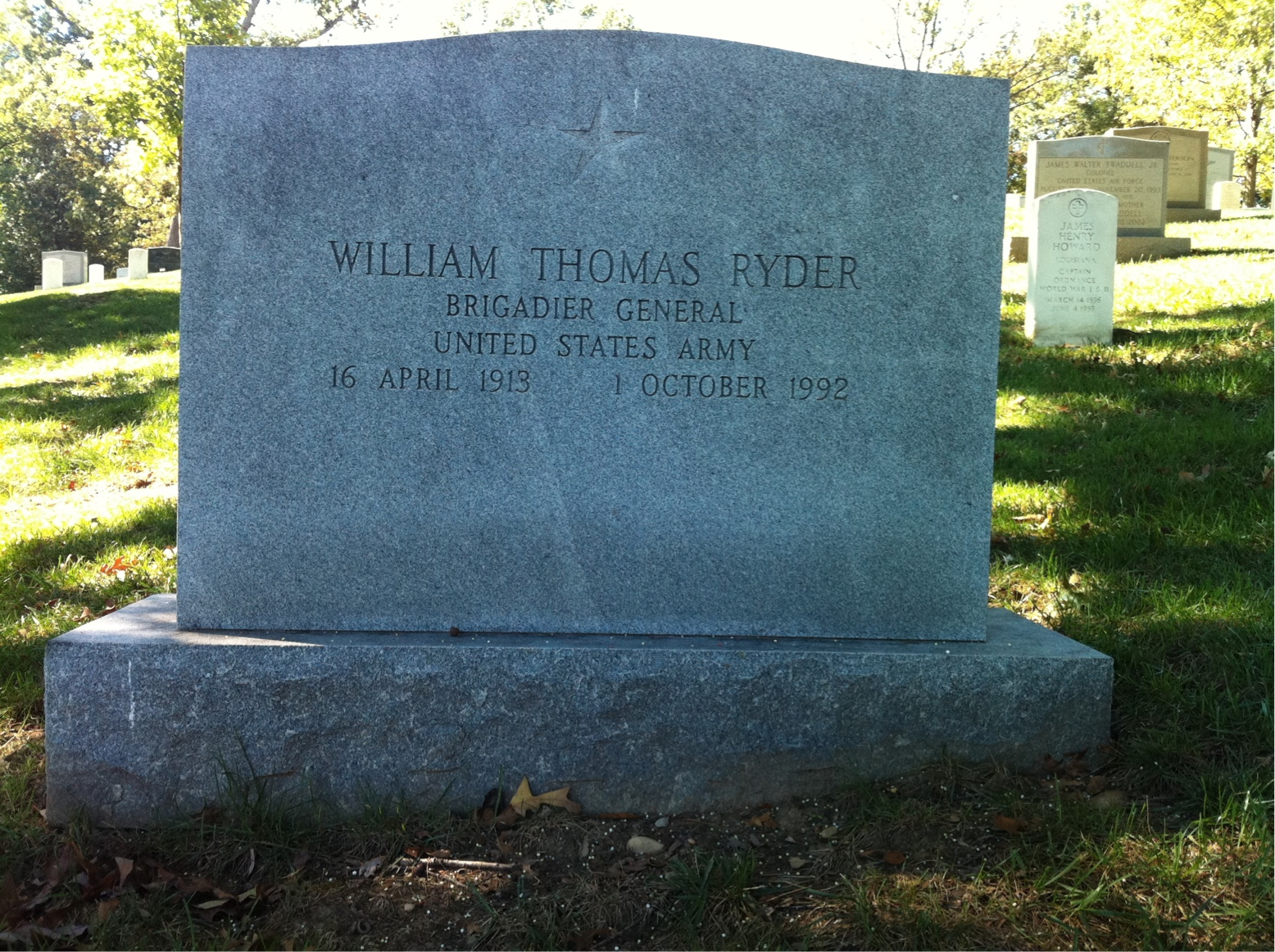
- The grave of Brigadier General William T. Ryder at Arlington National Cemetery.
- Born: April 16, 1913; St Louis, Missouri, United States
- Died: October 1, 1992 (aged 79); Pinehurst, North Carolina, United States
- Burial place: Arlington National Cemetery, Virginia, United States
- Military career
- Allegiance: United States
- Branch: United States Army
- Service years: 1936–1966
- Rank: Brigadier General
- Service number: 0-20298
- Commands: Parachute Test Platoon; 542nd Parachute Infantry Regiment
- Conflicts: World War II: Operation Husky; Korean War
- Awards: Army Distinguished Service Medal; Legion of Merit with three Oak Leaf Clusters; Bronze Star with Oak Leaf Cluster; Master Parachutist Badge

Brigadier General William Thomas Ryder (April 16, 1913 – October 1, 1992) was an officer of the United States Army and the first American paratrooper during World War II. Ryder helped pioneer Army airborne training, equipment and tactics alongside men like Jim Gavin, William Yarborough, Bill Lee, Art Gorham and Bud Miley. He was an aide to General of the Army Douglas MacArthur from 1944 until 1951. In the early 1960s he was a top Army expert in guided missile systems, retiring as a brigadier general in 1966.

== First American paratrooper ==
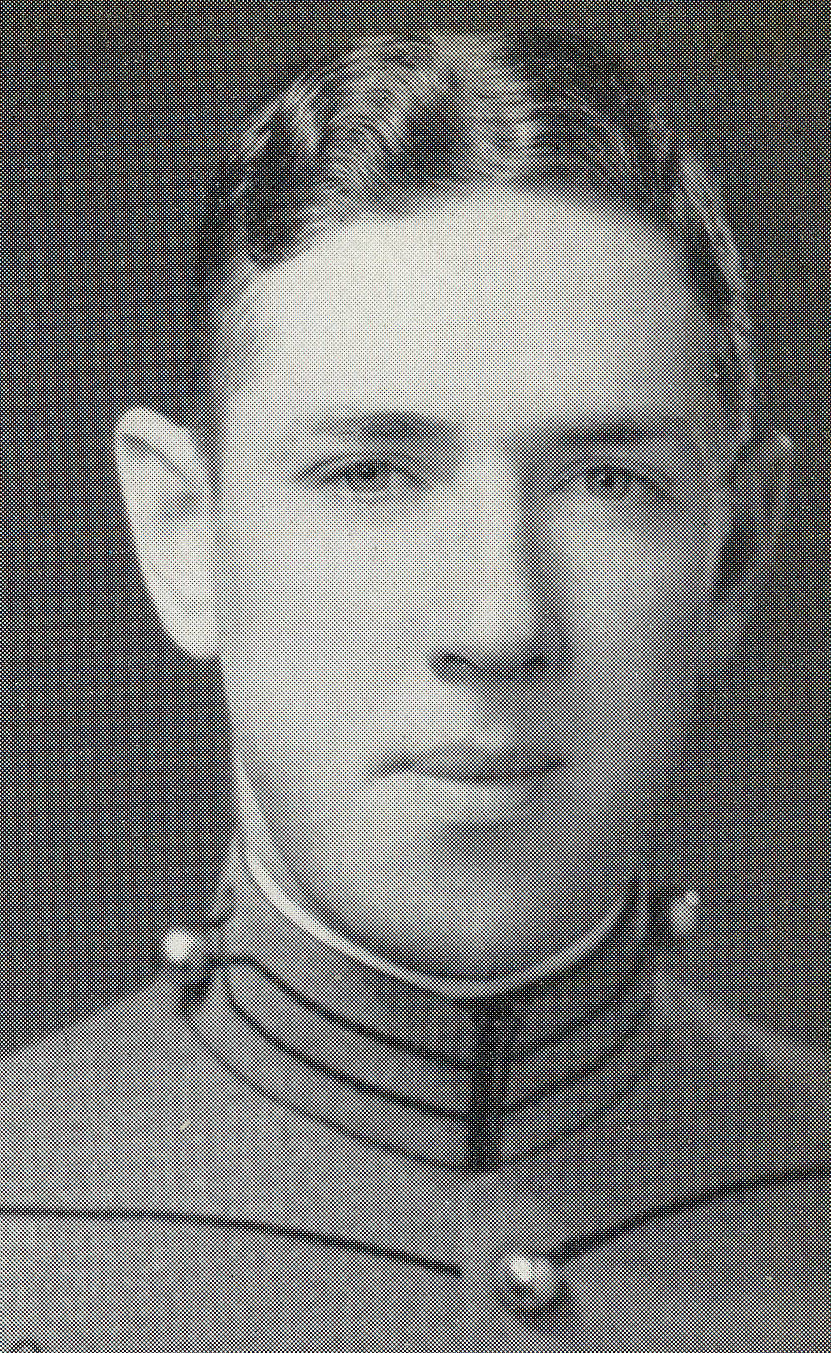
Ryder as a West Point cadet c. 1936

Ryder graduated from the United States Military Academy at West Point in 1936. Among his classmates were: Creighton Abrams, Charles Billingslea, William P. Yarborough and William Westmoreland.

More than 200 soldiers volunteered to make up the first platoon of paratroopers. Ryder was selected through a competitive written exam that was scheduled to take two hours. He finished it in 45 minutes while still earning the top score. The platoon billeted at Lawson Army Air Field near Ft. Benning. Ryder is credited with creating "Ryder's Death Ride" a 34-foot tower from which trainees practiced jumping. After completing a rigorous conditioning and training program that Ryder had devised, on August 16, 1940, Ryder and ten members of his platoon made their first jump from a Douglas C-33. Ryder was the first man to exit the aircraft. The first enlisted man to jump was Pvt. William N. "Red" King. The platoon conducted its first mass jump on August 29, 1940.

In April 1943 while assigned as parachute training officer of the Airborne Command at Camp Mackall, Ryder was temporarily assigned as liaison officer to the 52nd Troop Carrier Wing at Pope Air Force Base. On July 13, 1943, Ryder jumped into Sicily with Colonel James Gavin, commander of the 505th Parachute Infantry Regiment, as part of Operation Husky, the Allied invasion of Sicily. After hostilities had ceased in Sicily, Gavin tasked Ryder with returning the personal effects of 1st Battalion commander Arthur F. Gorham to his widow. Gorham was killed during the first few days of the assault and was credited by Gavin with accomplishing all of the Regiment's objectives.

He is also reported in at least one source to have jumped with the 509th Parachute Infantry Regiment in North Africa as part of Operation Torch in October 1942.

Upon his return from Sicily, Ryder was assigned as the regimental commander of the newly formed 542nd Infantry Regiment at Fort Benning, Georgia. Expecting to be deployed to Europe, Ryder was instead ordered in December 1943 to provide roughly 100 replacements for the Pacific theater. As was customary, Ryder escorted the men by train to the west coast. Upon his arrival at Ft. Ord he was ordered to Ft. Benning as"priority." When he returned he received the disheartening news that he was to dispatch 1,000 of his remaining troops to serve as replacements to airborne units in England preparing for the invasion of Europe. The regiment was deactivated on March 17, 1944.

== War and occupation in the Pacific ==
Following promotion to full colonel, in mid-February 1944 Ryder was dispatched to Brisbane, Australia to advise General Douglas MacArthur on airborne operations. He remained a member of MacArthur's staff until President Truman relieved MacArthur in 1951. During the occupation and rebuilding of Japan, Ryder was effectively the chief of staff to MG William F. Marquat.

During his time in the Pacific, Ryder met his future wife, Muriel, who was serving with the Red Cross there.

In the late 1950s and early 1960s, Ryder was the deputy chief of the public information division in Paris. By 1963 he was the director of special weapons in the office of the chief of research and development at the Pentagon. In this last post, he was an expert in guided missile systems. The general retired from active duty in 1966 moving to Pinehurst, North Carolina with his wife Muriel.

== Honors ==
The award given to the most outstanding graduate of the Airborne course at Ft. Benning is named for the general.

1990, General Ryder represented the Airborne to receive a proclamation by North Carolina Governor Jim Martin honoring the 50th anniversary of his first jump.

In 1995, the officer's golf course at Ft. Bragg was named for General Ryder.

In addition to the Master Parachutist Badge, Ryder's military decorations included the Distinguished Service Medal, Legion of Merit with three Oak Leaf Clusters and the Bronze Star Medal with Oak Leaf Cluster.

General Ryder died due to cancer in 1992 and was interred in Arlington National Cemetery.
