= Arthur F. Gorham =

- Born: January 11, 1915; Brooklyn, New York, United States
- Died: July 12, 1943 (aged 28); Sicily, Italy
- Burial place: Bellevue, Ohio, United States
- Military career
- Allegiance: United States
- Branch: United States Army
- Service years: 1938–1943
- Rank: Lieutenant Colonel
- Unit: Infantry Branch
- Commands: 1st Battalion, 505th Parachute Infantry Regiment
- Conflicts: World War II; Operation Husky †
- Awards: Distinguished Service Cross (2); Purple Heart

Arthur Fulbrook Gorham (January 11, 1915 – July 12, 1943) was a United States Army officer and paratrooper. Gorham was the first commander of the 1st Battalion, 505th Parachute Infantry Regiment, part of the 82nd Airborne Division. He led the unit from its inception until Operation Husky, the July 1943 Allied invasion of Sicily, where he was killed in action.

== Early life and family ==
Gorham was born in Brooklyn, New York, to James Allison Gorham, Sr. (September 13, 1890 – February 9, 1972) and Louise Fox Gorham (April 1885 – July 4, 1966). His older brother was James Allison Gorham, Jr. (November 26, 1911 – May 15, 2005). Gorham's parents were second generation Americans and were both of Scottish descent. The Gorhams moved from Brooklyn to Bellevue, Ohio, in July 1917. James, Sr. owned a successful dry goods business.

While awaiting transportation from Governors Island in New York to his first assignment after graduating from West Point, Gorham renewed a previous acquaintance with Corrine "Colonel" Bennett (later Clarke) (October 21, 1917 – October 20, 2001). They had met for the first time a few years earlier at an army football game. Bennett was then a senior at the University of Wichita where she was president of the Pi Beta Phi sorority (then called the Sorosis Sorority), captain of the rifle team and had held titles in both golf and tennis. The two were married on June 21, 1939, in Wichita, Kansas. The couple had one child, Bruce Bennett Gorham Clarke (born January 26, 1943, at Ft. Benning, GA). Clarke followed in his father's footsteps graduating from West Point, serving in an airborne unit, fighting in Vietnam at Khe Sanh and commanding at every level from a platoon to a brigade.

== Education ==
Gorham was educated in Bellevue, Ohio, first at the Ellis School and he later graduated from Bellevue High School in 1932. During high school, he played in the band for four years, was secretary of the junior and senior classes, earned two varsity letters in football and two more in track and served on the high school newspaper, the Blazer, for four years. He was also a member of the National Honor Society.

After his high school graduation, having not secured a sought-after appointment to West Point, he attended Miami University in Oxford, Ohio, for a year where he played football winning his "numeral." During this time he pledged the Ohio Alpha chapter of Phi Delta Theta fraternity. Gorham left Miami when he received the principal Congressional appointment to West Point from Rep. William L. Fiesinger. After taking the West Point substantiating examination in February 1934 he spent time at Stanton Preparatory Academy in Cornwall, New York.

On July 2, 1934, Gorham joined the Class of 1938 at West Point. While at West Point, Gorham was known for pipe smoking, surviving academics and maintaining a famously clean M1 rifle. To his classmates, he was known for his easy-going way and love of jazz. He played football for two years winning two monograms as an end on the Army "B" team and earned a marksmanship medal—one shot short of winning an "expert" badge he refused to wear the award mailing it home to his parents instead. During his four years he was an acting corporal, acting sergeant, sergeant, acting company supply officer, and, in his fourth year, wore three chevrons as the lieutenant for Company B. Gorham graduated in the middle of his class and received a commission as an infantry officer. Gorham's graduation was front page news in his native Bellevue. At the time, he was just the second graduate of Central High School to graduate from a service academy. Admiral John Greenslade was previously the school's sole graduate.

== Early Career and Leadership Style ==
After less than two years with the 30th Infantry in San Francisco, Gorham moved to Fort Benning, Georgia. In November 1941 he graduated from the newly created Airborne School receiving a "Certificate of Proficiency" signed by then Major Robert Sink and, more importantly, a set of silver jump wings. A month later, he completed the school's demolition and sabotage course. It was at this point in his short career that he began to stand out. As one of the early airborne qualified officers, he gained more rank and responsibility as the United States began to form parachute regiments and later airborne divisions.

In 1941 he volunteered to organize the first group of paratroopers on skis. So in February 1942 then-Captain Gorham took his B Company, 503rd Parachute Infantry Regiment to Alta, Utah, where the United States was testing the concept of dropping paratroopers into the Alps behind the Germans and having them ski down to attack and harass their lines of communication. During this period Gorham is credited with having made the first parachute jump from over 10,000 feet. As was his leadership style, before Gorham would let anyone else jump he first made a solo jump to test whether it was safe. On that first jump, he was soon followed by LT Robert Ellis, SGT Roy Taylor and SGT W.P. Walsh. The troopers trained hard, but falling on skis was different than falling when landing in a parachute jump. There were many legs and ankles injured. Despite much favorable press, the project was eventually abandoned and the troopers were spread out to the newly forming parachute units.

In a 1989 article in Assembly, the magazine of the U.S. Military Academy's Association of Graduates, his son Bruce B.G. Clarke described Gorham's leadership style:

In researching the paraskiers I found Art Gorham described as “soft spoken.” Elsewhere he is described as "Hard-nose" Gorham because of his strictness and insistence on discipline within his battalion. Brigadier General Walt Winton has written: “he exemplified the good commander, demonstrating leadership, concern, initiative, and intelligence. One example of his leadership was his joining then Colonel Gavin and a few others in experimental free fall jumps. The normal static line jump was quite exciting enough for most. Art had an abiding concern for his subordinates. When the regiment made PCS [permanent change of station] was locked down at Fort Bragg, prior to deployment, Colonel and Mrs. Gorham threw open their quarters on post to shelter the battalion's officers and their wives.

The article goes on to report this observation by General Winton:

Our radio call signs in that era were assigned rather whimsically, probably by the regimental communications officer, and Art's call sign was Hard-nose. Some of Art's subordinates do not believe that the emphasis on the call sign does justice to a great leader and a fine gentlemen.

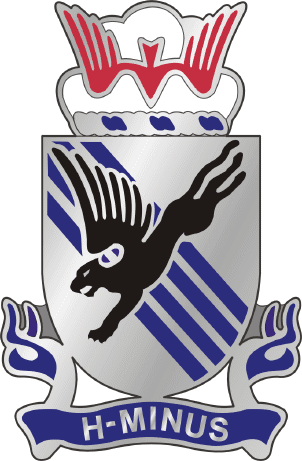
Crest of the 505th Parachute Infantry Regiment

In the summer of 1942 the 505th Parachute Infantry Regiment was activated in the tarpaper shack Frying Pan area of Fort Benning, overlooking Lawson Army Airfield. Gorham, then a major, was assigned as commander of the 1st Battalion. There was no time lost in getting a hard training schedule started.

In Combat Jump: The Young Men Who Led the Assault into Fortress Europe, July 1943 (page 53), Ed Ruggero writes:

Like Gavin, Gorham also spoke quietly. In spite of his youth, he had an almost fatherly demeanor. He shared the hardships and he treated the men with respect from the privates up...he had a genuine concern for their welfare. This didn’t mean the men of the First Battalion were coddled, in fact, it often meant the opposite. Gorham and the other airborne commanders believed the best thing for the men – the thing that came as close as anything could to guaranteeing they would make it home—was hard training.”

Gorham was promoted to lieutenant colonel on December 26, 1942, just shy of his 28th birthday. At the time of his promotion, he was one of the youngest lieutenant colonels in the U.S. Army.

== Operation Husky: The Invasion of Sicily ==
On the night of July 9, 1943, the paratroopers of the 505th Parachute Infantry Regiment loaded aircraft and departed the coast of North Africa for the island of Sicily. The 1st Battalion, under the command of the 28-year-old Gorham spearheaded the first regimental-sized airborne assault. Winds were high as they jumped in the early morning hours of July 10 and the paratroopers were scattered across and well beyond their drop zones. Assembling into small groups, the men began to wreak havoc among the German and Italian defenders of Sicily.

On July 10, at about 0600, Gorham with 30 men from his headquarters company joined up with CPT Ed Sayre who had gathered up about 50 troopers from A Company. LTC Gorham congratulated Sayre for capturing an Italian fortified farmhouse and over 20 machine guns and then they began organizing a defense, anticipating an enemy attack from the north on the road from Niscemi. Bolstering the lightly armed paratroopers’ firepower were the 20 captured machine guns with 500,000 rounds of ammunition. The troopers, now about 90 strong, did not have long to wait. (During the period covered by the narrative, LTC Gorham probably never had more than 100 paratroopers under his command, probably even fewer, thanks to casualties.) At 0700, a German armored column approached from the north, Preceded by an advanced guard of two Motorcycles and a Volkswagen. The paratroopers, following LTC Gorham's command, allowed the advance guard to close to within point blank range, then opened fire killing or capturing them. The tanks deployed and stopped. The Germans then sent in two companies of about 200 men, of a Panzer Grenadier unit. The German infantry advanced on foot across open ground. The troopers, again following LTC Gorham's command, allowed them to close within about 100 yards, then opened fire. Throughout the engagements, LTC Gorham exposed himself at personal risk to encourage his troops and direct their fire.

The Germans were decimated. Only a handful escaped. The German tanks did not advance. The reasons for the tanks not doing so are not clear, but it is not hard to imagine that the crews were stunned by the volume of fire the troopers put out with their 20 machine guns.

Later that day, the paratroopers married up with 2-16 Infantry of the First Infantry Division. LTC Gorham attached his band of troopers, as required in the Regimental plan, to the 2-16 IN commanded by LTC Joseph Crawford. Anti-tank firepower was only slightly improved, however, as 2-16 IN had only a single 57 mm anti-tank gun. Using a 2-16 IN radio, a report was sent to the 1st ID command post, where MG Matthew Ridgway, the 82d Airborne Division Commander was located, that Gorham's intrepid band of troopers had seized Objective Y, meant to be taken by the entire 505th PIR. Writing after the war, then-Colonel James M. Gavin, Commander of the 505th PIR, who was fighting with another band of his paratroopers to well to the east of Objective Y, said “Colonel Gorham and his small group of troopers...Accomplished all the missions assigned to the entire regimental combat team. It was a remarkable performance, and I know nothing like it that occurred at any time later in the war”. >

The next day, July 12, Gorham and his unit came face to face with another German tank near Niscemi, Sicily. William B. Breuer in Drop Zone Sicily describes the action: Gorham “grabbed a rocket launcher and edged his way within range of a menacing Tiger Tank which had continued to roll forward. Gorham, out in the open and in full view of enemy tankers, kneeled to take aim at the tank. Gunners in the Tiger spotted the parachute leader and fired an 88mm shell at Gorham at point blank range. Gorham, hardnosed to the end, fell over dead." The citation for the Distinguished Service Cross he was awarded for his actions reports: “Lieutenant Colonel Gorham personally manned a rocket launcher and destroyed one tank. While attempting to destroy another with hand grenades and a rifle, Lieutenant Colonel Gorham was killed.” This second description is consistent with the reports relayed to Gorham's family by Chicago Tribune reporter John Hall Thompson in December 1943.

Gorham's death was first reported by Bill Ryder in a March of Time radio broadcast on August 19, 1943. "One of the outstanding examples of heroism was Lt. Col. Arthur Gorham whose unit was attacked by tanks. When one of his bazooka teams was wiped out by an approaching tank, he manned the weapon himself and got the tank single-handed before being killed himself by another tank on their flank."

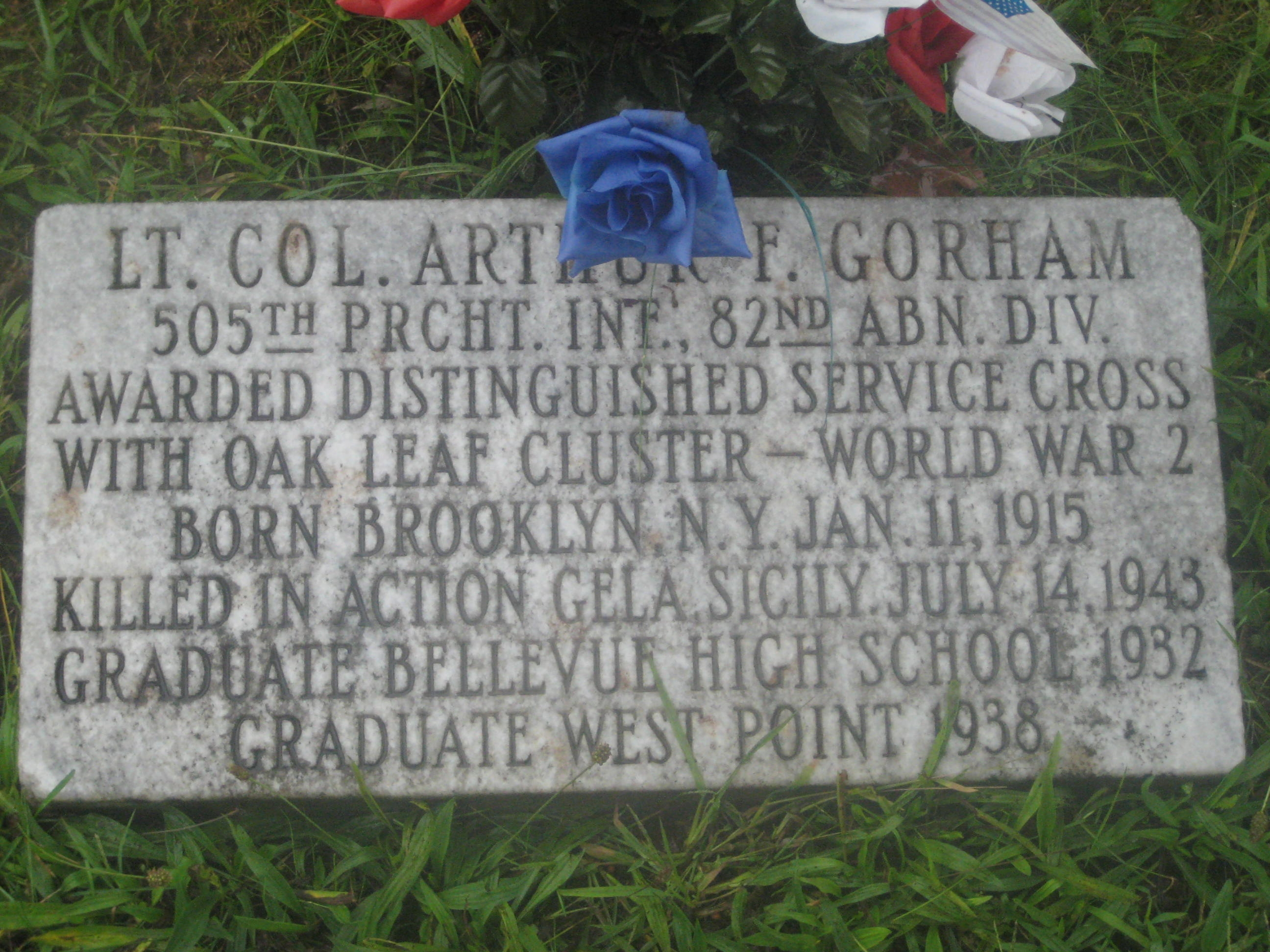
Headstone on LTC Gorham's grave in Bellevue, Ohio (photo by Bruce B.G. Clarke and posted with permission)

There is some confusion about the actual date of Gorham's death. Army records list his date of death as July 11, 1941. His second Distinguished Service Cross citation lists the date as July 14, 1943. This is the date listed on Gorham's headstone. In Phil Nordyke's Four Stars of Valor, page 425, he explains: "Colonel's Gorham's death is listed in Army records as July 11, 1941. Both Captain Edwin Sayre, in his monograph written in 1947, and Dean McCandless, who was with Gorham when he was killed, state that Gorham was in fact killed during action that took place on July 12, 1943. McCandless states that he found Gorham's CP (command post) on the morning of July 11 and was put on outpost duty by Gorham that evening. He states that the next morning Gorham recalled him and they moved to Hill 41, where Gorham was killed."

For his actions on Sicily, Gorham was awarded two Distinguished Service Crosses. Gorham was also posthumously awarded the Purple Heart, the Combat Infantryman Badge and a combat star to his jump wings.

In August 1948, Gorham's remains were returned to the United States. He was interred in Bellevue, Ohio, in a family plot.

== Tributes and memorials ==
In a letter to the Gorham family, Gavin credited Gorham and his paratroopers with much of Operation Husky's success: "Most of the combat success of the regiment in Sicily was due to Art and the men of his command." In his book, On to Berlin (page 47), Gavin wrote "Colonel Gorham and his small group of troopers and the lieutenants from the 3rd Battalion, 504th, accomplished all of the missions assigned to the entire regimental combat team. It was a remarkable performance, and I know of nothing like it that occurred at any time later in the war...His death was a great loss to the division."

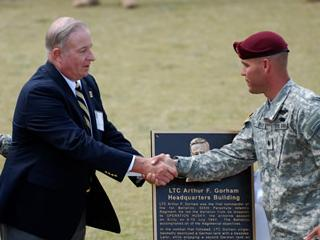
Dedication of the Arthur F. Gorham Headquarters Building, pictured on the left is COL Bruce B.G. Clarke (LTC Gorham's son) and right is LTC Hugh Bair, commander of 1/505

General Ridgway, commander of the 82nd Airborne Division, probably put this in the best perspective when he wrote to Gorham's widow: "The action which resulted in his death was typical of his inspiring leadership, for it was he that personally instilled the spirit of the attack at a time that those around him were thinking only of defense, and in person led the attack, which succeeded. His indomitable spirit acknowledged no odds.”

The tributes to Gorham include:

- In the Museo Archeologico Regionale di Gela (Regional Archaeological Museum of Gela) a poster exhibit will be unveiled in July 2013 commemorating the 70th anniversary of Operation Husky. Gorham is prominently featured in the exhibit.
- On May 18, 2013, Gorham was inducted into the Bellevue High School "Halls of Excellence."
- On May 21, 2008, the new headquarters of the 1st Battalion, 505th Parachute Infantry Regiment was named in Gorham's honor. During this ceremony a memorial was also dedicated to the members of the battalion killed in the global war on terrorism.
- In May 1998, a room in the battalion's former dining facility was named in Gorham's honor.
- A street at Ft. Bragg is named for Gorham.
- Gorham's name is included among all those killed in action on a tablet erected at Bellevue's Fallen Heroes Memorial Plaza.
- There is a memorial marker which bears his name near the 82nd Airborne Museum. The marker was laid in 1948 to commemorate the naming of a street for Gorham.
- Gorham's name is included among the 39 killed near Ponte Dirillo near Gela in Sicily. The memorial was erected by the citizens of Sicily and is maintained by Senor Ventura. Each year, the local residents in conjunction with Naval personnel from the nearby Naval Computer and Telecommunication Station, Naval Air Station Sigonella hold a ceremony to remember the paratroopers.

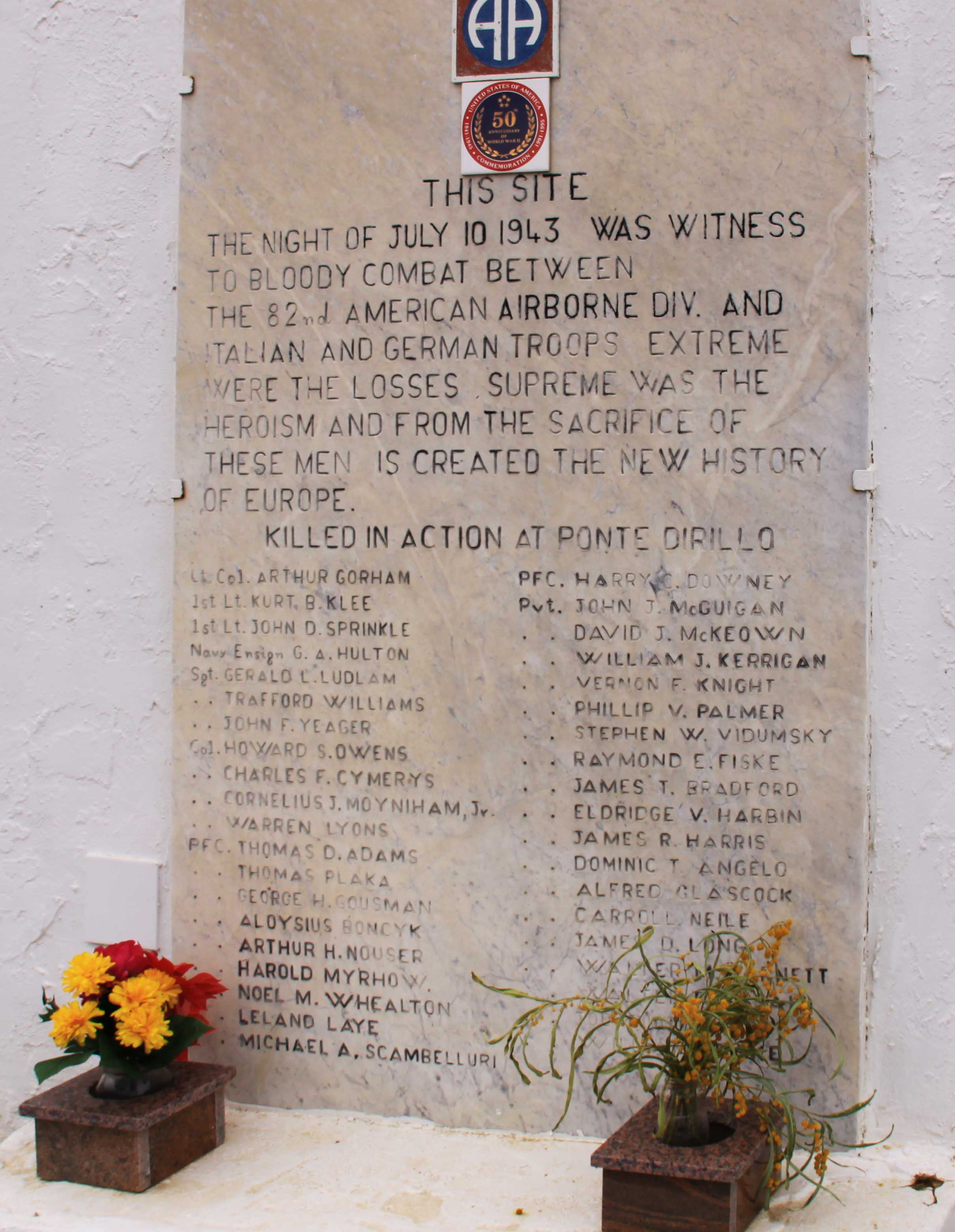
Memorial to Lt. Col Gorham and the 82nd Airborne at Ponte Dirillo.

- The DeMolay chapter, a Masonic youth leadership organization, in his hometown of Bellevue, Ohio, was previously named in Gorham's honor but it is no longer active.
- The Masonic Lodge in Bellevue was also for a time named in Gorham's honor.
- Gorham's name is included among all those killed in action on a memorial plaque inside the American Legion Post No. 44 in Bellevue, Ohio.
- Gorham's name is included in a plaque overlooking Trophy Point at West Point honoring the members of the Class of 1938 who gave their lives for their country. In total, 16 members of the Class of '38 died during World War II (9 KIA, 15 died or executed as POWs).
- Gorham's name is included on a plaque in Cullum Memorial Hall at West Point. His name was added in a ceremony on October 6, 1949, presided over by West Point Superintendent Major General Bryant Moore and Air Force Chief of Staff General Hoyt Vandenberg.
- Tim Dyas' book of war poetry, Barbed Words of War, was donated by the poet to the USMA library with the following inscription: "23 Oct 2000 To: Gen. Matthew B. Ridgway, LtGen James M. Gavin, LTC Arthur Gorham (KIA). My leaders from USMA who knew only one way to lead – up front. Tim Dyas"
- For a time, Gorham's family sponsored a scholarship at Bellevue High School in his name. The first scholarship of $500 was awarded in 1954. ($4009 in 2010 terms)
- Gorham's youngest grandson, James, has Gorham as his middle name. Two of his three great grandsons, Philip and Matthew, are also, in part, named for their grandfather. Great grandson Philip is named for both Gorham and Colonel Philip Cochran.
