= Howard L. Vickery =

United States Navy admiral (1892–1946)

Howard Leroy Vickery
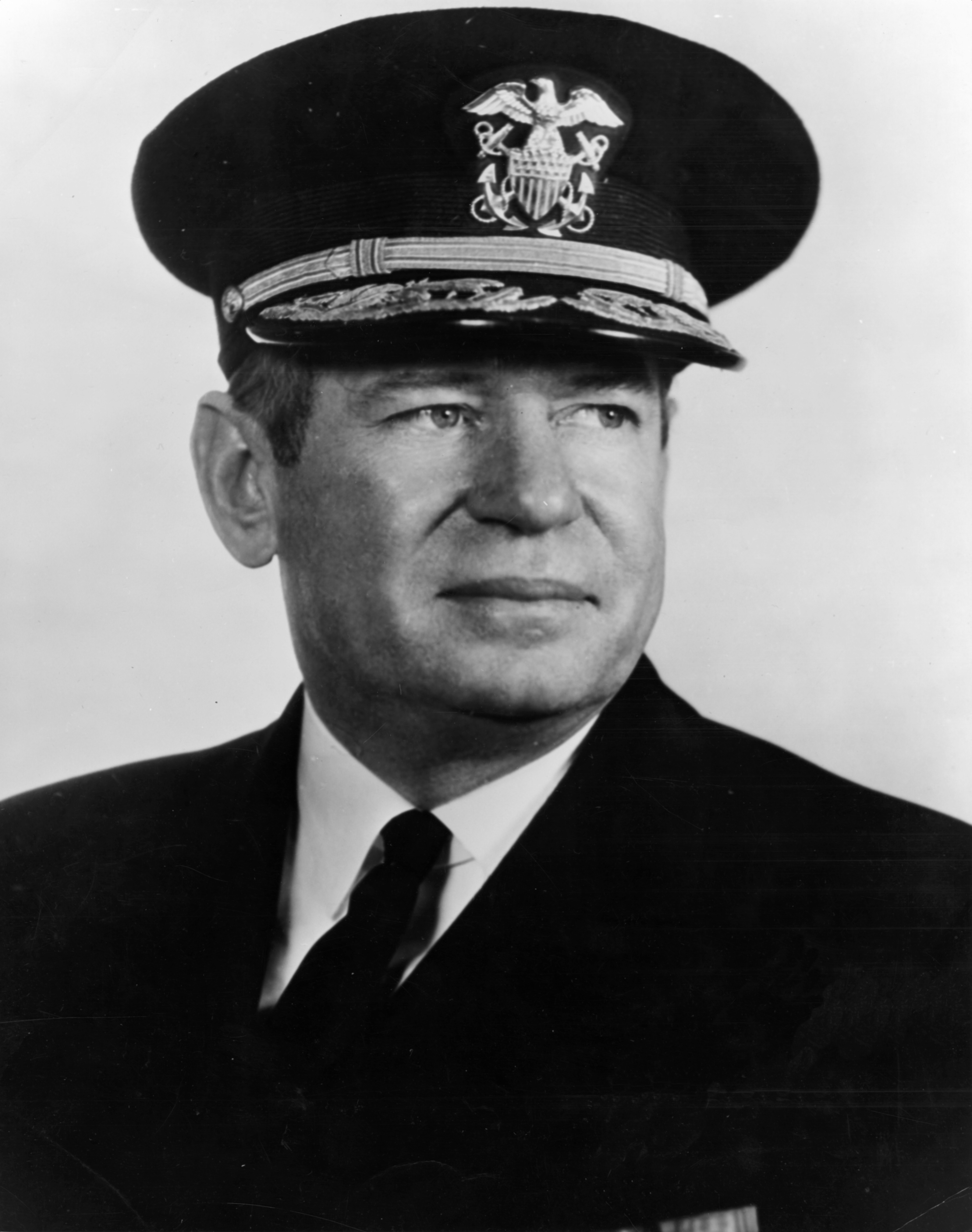
- Howard L. Vickery c. 1943
- Born: April 20, 1892; Bellevue, Ohio, US
- Died: March 21, 1946 (aged 53); Palm Springs, California, US
- Burial place: Arlington National Cemetery
- Military career
- Allegiance: United States of America
- Branch: United States Navy
- Service years: 1915–1945
- Rank: Vice admiral
- Commands: Vice Chairman, U.S. Maritime Commission; Deputy Administrator, War Shipping Administration
- Conflicts: World War I World War II
- Awards: Distinguished Service Medal; Order of the British Empire

Howard Leroy Vickery (April 20, 1892 – March 21, 1946) was a decorated U.S. naval officer with the rank of Vice admiral. He was renowned merchant shipbuilder and served as Vice Chairman, U.S. Maritime Commission during World War II.

== Early life and career ==
Vickery was born in Bellevue, Ohio to Willis Vickery and Anna Louise Schneider. He went to public schools and later attended East High School in Cleveland. He took the entrance examination for the United States Naval Academy in 1910 but failed. He made another attempt the following year and passed. In 1915 he took a B. S. degree from Annapolis and was appointed an ensign in the United States Navy. Though Vickery had hoped to go to Asia, he was instead assigned to Boston. There he met Marguerite Blanchard, whom he married in 1917. Shortly prior to his marriage was the start of World War I, and a few days after the wedding he left for sea on a ship to France to guard the first convoy there. He had earned two stripes on his sleeve by the end of the war, as well as being able to study at the Massachusetts Institute of Technology. In 1921 he received an M.Sc. degree from there. By the next year he was made a supervisor of submarine construction for the United States Navy superintendent constructor's office in San Francisco. Alongside this, from 1921 to 1925 he acted as the Boston Navy Yard's docking and outside superintendent.

Vickery left these positions in 1925 when he was sent to work as a treaty engineer for the Haitian Government. He stayed in Haiti for the next three years before returning to the United States. He stayed in Washington, D.C. as a member of the Bureau of Construction and Repair, but the next year in 1929, a requested to be transferred to Panama. There he was made technical adviser on shipping to the Governor General of the Philippines. During this time he left for Germany to see the construction of the Philippine ships. There he was able to witness the rebuilding of the German navy. He returned to the Bureau of Construction and Repair in 1934, this time as head of the secret War Plans Section of the Design Branch. He also took graduate courses at the Army Industrial College the same year. One of Vickery's first jobs was the investigation of the SS Morro Castle disaster. The report that was presented after a year of work by him and his subordinates made dramatic reforms to shipbuilding by calling for many new safety features in ships.

== During World War II ==
Vickery was an assistant to Emory S. Land, chairman of the United States Maritime Commission, between 1937 and 1940. Land oversaw all shipbuilding, design, and construction work for the United States Merchant Marine. Together the two were described as "one of the most remarkable combinations in Washington", and played a critical role in the foundation of the United States Merchant Marine Academy. By 1940 he was made a full member of Maritime Commission by President Roosevelt. There was much demand for shipbuilders at this time, including a request from a British commission to use American shipyards to build British freighters. Due to the shortage, Vickery hired Henry J. Kaiser as one of his shipbuilding experts, despite many advising against it. Vickery was appointed vice-chairman of the United States Maritime Commission and deputy administrator of the War Shipping Administration by 1942. Roosevelt asked that he produce 8,000,000 tons of shipping during 1942, and gave him enough steel and his choice of shipyards and shipbuilders. Vickery delivered on this order, and by July could declare that more new ships had been produced than had sunk since the attack on Pearl Harbor.

Admiral Vickery was responsible for vessel construction programs of the Commission commencing with the early Long Range Program to build 500 new merchant vessels in 10 years and then the much larger Emergency Shipbuilding program of World War II where under his leadership close to 6000 ships were built in only five years for the war effort. At its peak in 1943 there were over 650,000 men and women employed in shipyards on all coasts and the Great Lakes building ships for the commission. Without the tremendous feats of production accomplished by the Emergency Program the lifeline to Great Britain may have been severed by Germany's U-Boat offensive and the ability for U.S. forces to project their newfound military power across both Atlantic and Pacific Oceans would have been severely diminished.

A man with an amazing ability to retain information about shipyards and the vessels being built during the war, Vickery was tireless in his efforts to stay on top of the program. The strain of which eventually brought about a serious heart attack on September 25, 1944, which required him to be bedridden until early 1945 when he resumed his duties. His health never fully recovered, Admiral Vickery was granted retirement from the Navy in October 1945 and ended his duties at the Maritime Commission on December 31. By then, the phenomenal construction program of World War II was completed and both ships and shipyards were being liquidated as surplus to postwar requirements. For his service with the Maritime Commission, Vickery was decorated with Navy Distinguished Service Medal.

Vice admiral Howard L. Vickery died of heart attack on March 21, 1946, aged 53, in Palm Springs, California. He was buried with full military honors at Arlington National Cemetery, Virginia. He was survived by his wife Marguerite Blanchard Vickery (1892–1974) and their two children, a daughter Barbara Vickery Bowie (1923–2002) and a son Hugh Blanchard Vickery (1919–2001), who retired from the Navy as Commander.

Vickery Gate, the main public entrance and security facility at the United States Merchant Marine Academy in Kings Point, New York is named in his honor. He was also appointed posthumously Honorary Knight Commander of the Order of the British Empire for his service for the allied cause.

== Decorations ==

1st Row	Navy Distinguished Service Medal		
2nd Row	World War I Victory Medal with two battle Clasps	American Defense Service Medal	American Campaign Medal
3rd Row	European–African–Middle Eastern Campaign Medal	World War II Victory Medal	Honorary Knight Commander of the Order of the British Empire
