= 542nd Parachute Infantry Regiment =

- Active: 1 September 1943 – 1 July 1945
- Disbanded: yes
- Country: United States
- Branch: United States Army
- Type: Airborne
- Role: Airborne
- Size: Under 150
- Garrison/HQ: Fort Benning, Camp Mackall, North Carolina

Commanders
- Notable commanders: Lt. Colonel William T. Ryder

The 542nd Parachute Infantry Regiment was a regiment of the US Army during the World War II. Originally formed as a fully fledged regiment, the unit was later downsized to a battalion and kept in reserve in the United States until mid-1945 when it was deactivated.

== The 542nd Parachute Infantry Regiment ==
The 542nd Parachute Infantry Regiment came into existence on 1 September 1943 under the command of William T. Ryder, then a Lt. Colonel fresh from a tour of combat with the 82nd Airborne Division.

The unit was formed in a Regimental Tent Encampment north of the Chattahoochee River in Alabama with a cadre of 15 officers and 50 enlisted men, whose job it was to ensure a smooth organization and activation of the new regiment.

As a special incentive to the men and officers of the 542nd the Airborne Command said that if the men of the regiment did well in their Basic and Unit Training they would be deployed overseas early for their Combined Training. From the start it seemed as though the regiment was headed for great things, the rumor was that the unit was to be utilized in a special mission into the industrial part of Central Germany.

Men and officers alike began training in earnest, hoping for an early overseas movement. Spirit and zest abounded as the men took to their individual and group training, which included training in night movement and hand-to-hand combat, two of the cornerstones of paratroop training. The latter often spilled over into the local bars of Columbus, Georgia, when troops of the armored forces met troops of the airborne forces and both were adamant that they were the superior fighting force.

Training was proceeding well when, in December 1943, Lt. Colonel Ryder was ordered by Airborne Command to provide 100 trained replacements for duty in the Pacific Theater. Colonel Ryder complied and accompanied the men by train to their Port of Embarkation. Upon his return, however, all dreams of an early overseas deployment were dashed. Orders had come down ordering the regiment to provide 1000 more replacements to the European Theater, in anticipation of D-Day, then only months away.

The 542nd Staff complied and sent their best and most healthy soldiers off to fight the Germans among strangers. A glum mood settled over the bare regiment, now but a Battalion in size. Officers and Senior NCO's dreaded the thought of starting all over with the Basic Stage of Training.

Colonel Ryder was saved, accepting Transfer to the Pacific Theater as General MacArthur's Airborne Adviser, gaining promotion to full colonel in doing so. The regiment was a gutted shell with an uncertain future and no prospect of being sent overseas.

== 542nd Parachute Infantry Battalion ==
Airborne Command decided to cut its losses. On 17 March 1944, the 542nd Parachute Infantry Regiment was deactivated and reactivated as the 542nd Parachute Infantry Battalion, utilizing the 3rd Battalion, 542nd Parachute Infantry Regiment. 400 men were sent as replacements to the 504th Parachute Infantry Regiment, then fighting in the Anzio beachhead on the Italian Front.

The battalion remained at Fort Benning, Georgia, until 1 July 1944, when it was relocated to Camp Mackall, North Carolina, where it was attached to Airborne Center Command Headquarters, an attachment that would last for one year. While at Mackall, the battalion became an experimental unit of sorts, testing new techniques and equipment, as well as training for an overseas deployment as an independent battalion, like the 509th and 551st Parachute Infantry Battalions.

Professor John J. Iorio began his paratrooper career with the 542nd Battalion, before later joining the 17th Airborne Division in the Battle of the Bulge. He remembers it as a precursor to today's Special Forces, calling it the 542nd Parachute Raider Battalion, a unit full of cut-throats bent on killing Germans. His time with the battalion was a shaping moment in his life, a time he has never forgotten. Also during this period the Battalion sent groups of men on War Bonds drives as representatives of the U.S. Army Paratroopers, to raise money and attract new recruits.

On 1 July 1945, when the war with Germany was over, quietly and without fuss, the 542nd ceased to exist and was re-flagged the Airborne Center Training Detachment.

== The Airborne Center Training Detachment ==
The Battalion was reorganized by the removal of two line companies, whose men were either transferred overseas, or shuffled around the Detachment, to I Company, whose prime responsibility became, essentially what the battalion had been all along, an experimental outfit.

G Company was restocked with Glider Infantry and H Company with an Artillery Battery furnished from the 467th Airborne Field Artillery. The detachment spent the rest of its life span testing and developing tactics and equipment, demonstrating firepower and operations and providing men for Troop Carrier Training Exercises.

On 21 January 1946 the Detachment was transferred to Ft. Benning, Georgia, where it was broken up and its personnel were transferred to other commands, discharged or re-enlisted. Thus ended a great unit, always of high spirit, despite being stripped of its best men time and again. In its lifespan the 542nd provided the Army with much needed overseas replacements, who were highly trained and able to fill specialized roles in the other Parachute Regiments of the Army. It allowed Airborne Command to test new theories and develop new techniques for Airborne Warfare, and provided a good public image for the US Army Paratroopers in World War 2.
