= Esther Shaw =

American politician (1925–2017)

Esther L. Shaw (February 10, 1925 - March 16, 2017) was a state legislator in Maine. She lived in Chelsea, Maine and represented Kennebec County in 1961 and 1963. She was married to Stanley F. Shaw.

She was born in Bellevue, Ohio and attended York High School. She attended the University of Toledo before graduating from the University of Maine with a business management degree.
