= 505th Infantry Regiment =

Airborne unit of the United States Army

505th Parachute Infantry Regiment 505th Airborne Infantry Regiment 505th Infantry Regiment
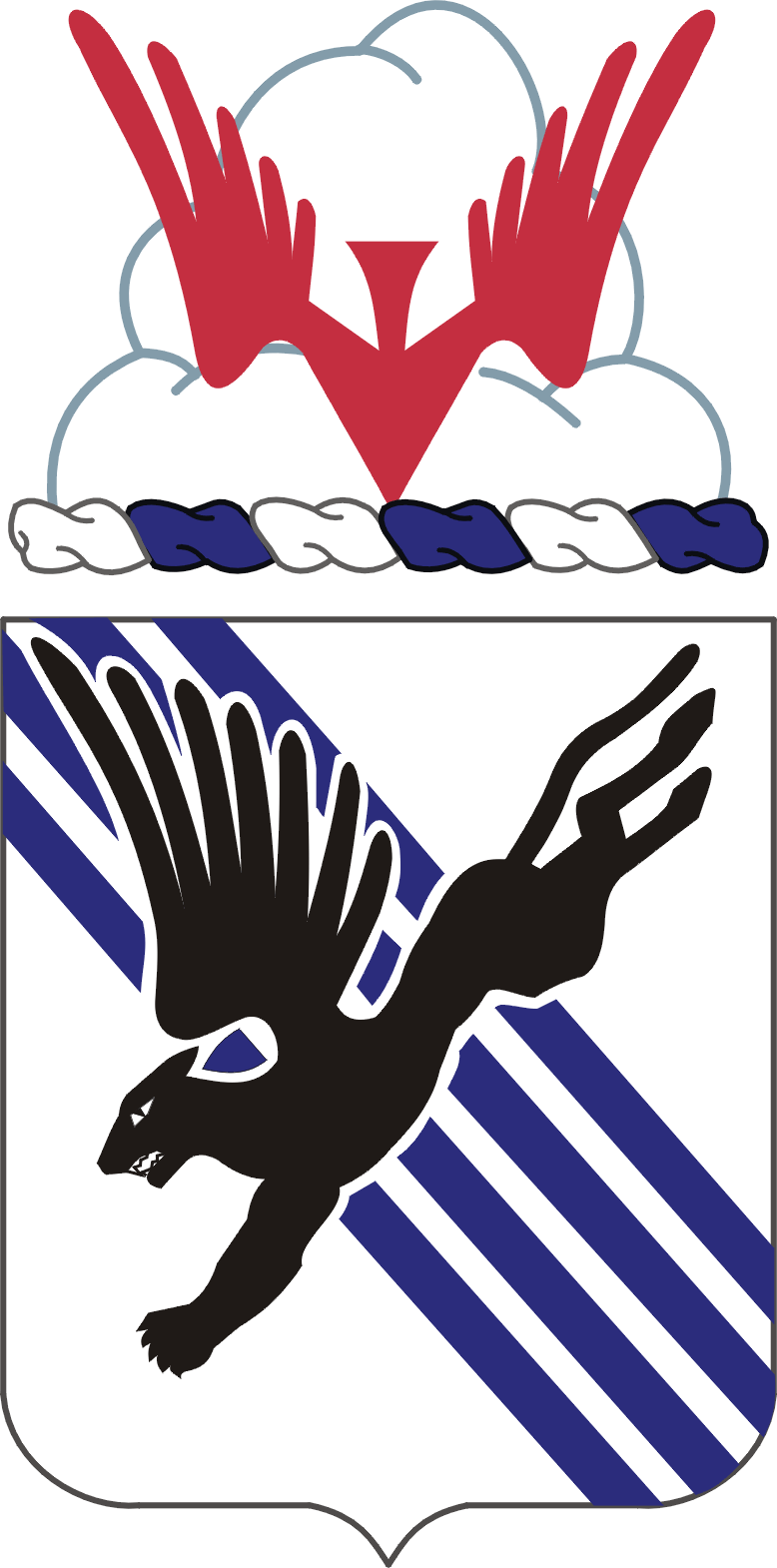
- 505th Infantry Regiment's coat of arms
- Founded: 1942; 84 years ago
- Branch: United States Army
- Part of: 82nd Airborne Division
- Garrison/HQ: Fort Bragg, North Carolina, U.S.
- Nickname: "Panthers"
- Motto: H-Minus
- Engagements: World War II; Operation Husky; Operation Avalanche; Operation Overlord; Operation Market Garden; Battle of the Bulge; Western Allied invasion of Germany; Vietnam War; Dominican Civil War; Invasion of Grenada; Invasion of Panama; Persian Gulf War; Kosovo War; NATO bombing of Yugoslavia; Somali Civil War; War in Afghanistan; Iraq War
- Decorations: Presidential Unit Citation (2) Military William Order French Croix de guerre Fourragère Belgian Fourragère

Commanders
- Current commander: COL Daniel Leard
- Notable commanders: James M. Gavin; William E. Ekman; Melvin Zais; Thomas J. H. Trapnell; Bryan R. Owens; Lloyd Austin; James Huggins; Jefforey Smith, William Garrison, Larry Redmond

Insignia
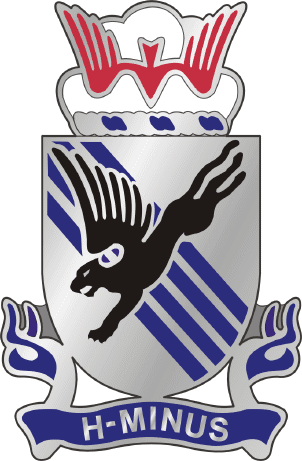
- Distinctive unit insignia

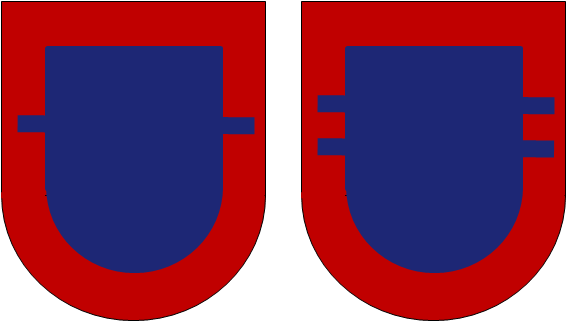
- Beret flashes of the 1st and 2nd Battalions, 505th Infantry Regiment

The 505th Infantry Regiment (505th IR), formerly and colloquially the 505th Parachute Infantry Regiment (505th PIR) and the 505th Airborne Infantry Regiment (505th AIR), is an airborne infantry regiment of the United States Army, one of four infantry regiments of the 82nd Airborne Division of the United States Army, with a long and distinguished history.

Activated in July 1942 during World War II, the 505th Parachute Infantry Regiment participated in the Allied invasion of Sicily, later landing at Salerno, the Battle of Normandy, the Netherlands and the Battle of the Bulge. During the 1960s, the 505th was one of the units which played a role in Operation Power Pack in the Dominican Republic and later assisted local authorities during the civil disturbances which occurred within the United States. The regiment was sent to the Republic of Vietnam in 1968 during the Vietnam War. After the Vietnam War, the 505th participated in various military operations. Among them were Operation Urgent Fury, Operation Just Cause, Operation Desert Shield, Operation Desert Storm, Operation Restore Hope, Operation Enduring Freedom (OEF) and Operation Iraqi Freedom. The regiment's most recent engagement has been in Afghanistan. The brigade deployed to Afghanistan from July 2019 to March 2020. Currently its 1st and 2nd battalions are active. Both battalions are assigned to the 3rd Brigade Combat Team, 82nd Airborne Division at Fort Bragg, North Carolina.

== History ==
=== World War II ===
Under the command of Colonel James M. Gavin, the 505th Parachute Infantry Regiment (PIR) was activated at Fort Benning, Georgia on 6 July 1942, during World War II, as part of the U.S. Airborne Command. Gavin, then just 35, was an early airborne pioneer, who led the men of the 505th through some extremely grueling training. In early 1943, for instance, he noted in his diary, "In 36 hours the regiment had marched well over 50 miles, maneuvered and seized an airhead and defended it from counterattack while carrying full combat loads and living off reserve rations". In February 1943, the 505th was assigned to the 82nd Airborne Division, commanded by Major General Matthew Ridgway, then stationed at Fort Bragg, North Carolina. The other two regiments serving alongside the 505th were the 504th PIR and the 325th Glider Infantry Regiments, and other supporting units. In late March the 505th was visited by many distinguished political and military leaders, including, among numerous others, General George C. Marshall, General Henry H. Arnold, British Field Marshal Sir John Dill and Anthony Eden.

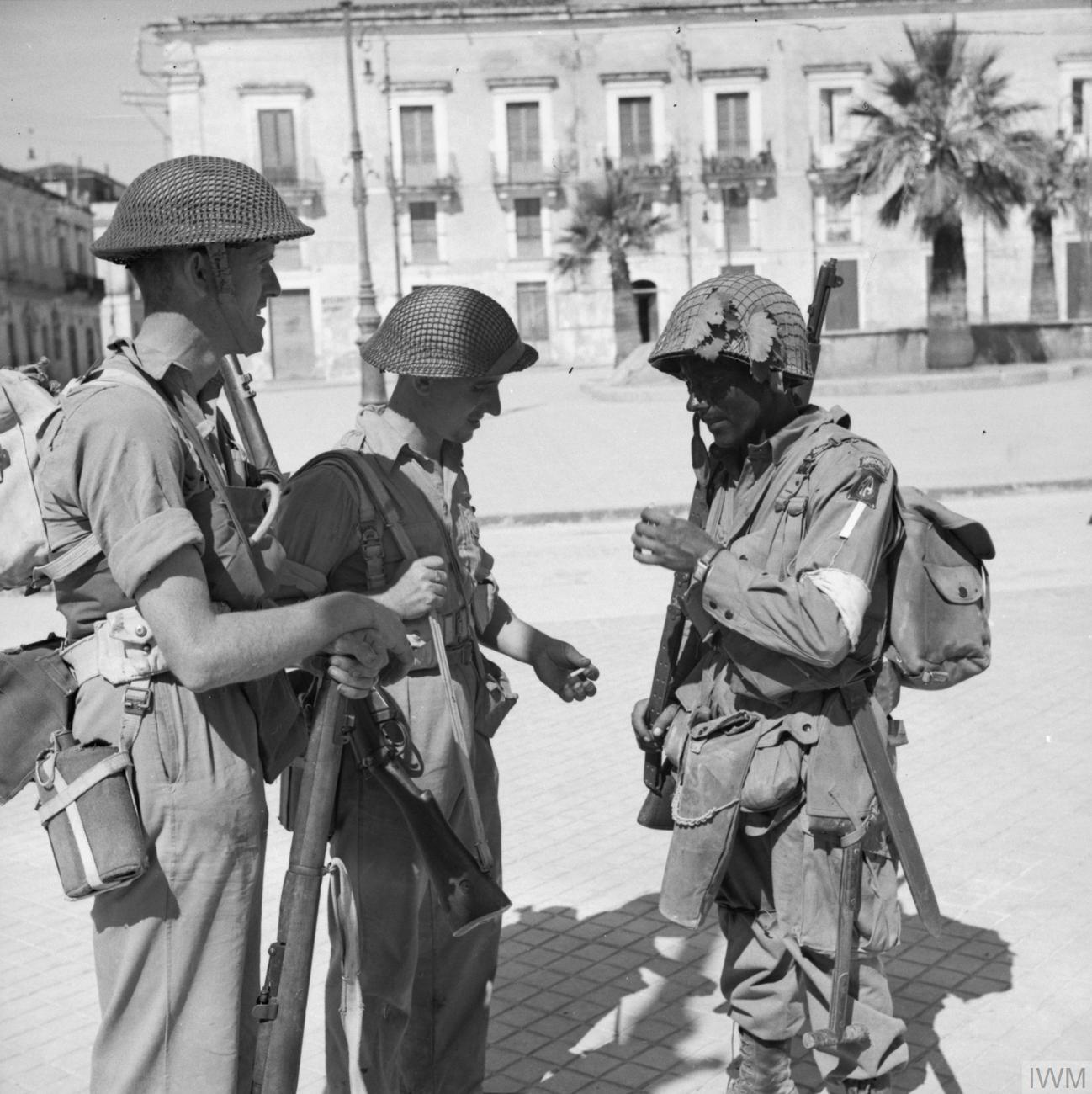
British troops of the 6th Battalion, Durham Light Infantry chat with an American paratrooper of the 505th PIR in Avola, Sicily, 11 July 1943.

In April, in preparation for the Allied invasion of Sicily (codenamed Operation Husky), the regiment was moved to Tunisia, in North Africa, where they completed six weeks of training. The 505th (organized into a regimental combat team with the addition of the 3rd Battalion of the 504th, along with the 376th Parachute Field Artillery Battalion and 'C' Company of the 307th Airborne Engineer Battalion temporarily attached) made its first combat jump behind enemy lines into Gela in the early hours of 10 July 1943, which was the first regimental sized combat jump in the history of the United States Army. High winds on the 505th's drop zone caused a large number of the regiment to be scattered all over the island, with up to 100 men landing in the British Eighth Army's sector. The 505th suffered heavy losses during the relatively brief campaign, including Lieutenant Colonel Arthur F. Gorham, the 1st Battalion commander, who was killed. The regiment then returned to North Africa in August for refit to absorb replacements before taking part in the assault on Salerno, on the night of 14 September, where they made their second combat jump. The regiment continued to fight in the Italian campaign, where the 505th, aided by tanks of the British 23rd Armoured Brigade, captured the city of Naples in early October, later helping the Allies breach the Volturno Line before returning to Naples for occupation duty.

In October Gavin was promoted to brigadier general and became the assistant division commander (ADC) of the 82nd Airborne Division. Gavin was replaced by Lieutenant Colonel Herbert F. Batcheller, formerly the regimental executive officer (XO). Soon afterwards, the 505th was pulled back to the United Kingdom, together with the rest of the 82nd Airborne Division (minus the 504th PIR) where they began training for Operation Overlord, the Allied invasion of Normandy. Originally sent to Northern Ireland, the 505th went to Quorn in Leicestershire, in the Midlands region of England in February 1944 and began strenuous training in preparation for the invasion.

In the American airborne landings in Normandy in June 1944, the 505th PIR actually jumped before its scheduled "H-Hour", thus earning their motto "H-minus". Upon completing operations in the Ste. Mere-Eglise area, the unit was awarded the Presidential Unit Citation. In September 1944, the unit then participated in Operation Market Garden, in which the regiment received a second Presidential Unit Citation. The 505th later, in December 1944, fought in the Battle of the Bulge, the largest battle fought on the Western Front during World War II. By the end of the war, the 505th was awarded three foreign distinguished unit citations: the French fourragère, the Netherlands Military Order of William, and the Belgium fourragère. Following the German surrender in May 1945, the regiment served as part of the Allied occupation force in Berlin.

Three of the five members of the 82nd Airborne Division to receive the Distinguished Service Cross twice during World War II were members of the regiment. They were the regiment's first commander, then-Colonel James M. Gavin, the 1st Battalion commander, Lieutenant Colonel Arthur F. Gorham and the 2nd Battalion commander, Lieutenant Colonel Benjamin H. Vandervoort.

=== Post World War II ===
After the war, the 505th returned to Fort Bragg, North Carolina. In 1947, the 3rd Battalion was reduced to zero strength. The separate 555th Parachute Infantry Battalion (the "Triple Nickles") the army's only all-black airborne unit, was then inactivated, and its paratroopers were reassigned to the 505th's 3rd Battalion. Soon after, its black paratroopers began to be reassigned as individuals throughout the 82nd Airborne Division, making it the first division in the U.S. Army to become fully integrated. In June 1957, the 505th Parachute Infantry Regiment was reorganized and redesignated as the 505th Infantry Regiment and relieved from assignment to the 82nd. This marked the end of the era of infantry regiments as tactical units and the beginning of the Pentomic era, in which regimental numbers were used for the purpose of perpetuating lineages and honors.

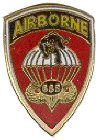
555th Parachute Infantry Battalion Association patch.

Effective 1 September 1957 the lineage of Company A, 505 PIR was reorganized and redesignated as HHC, 1st Airborne Battle Group, 505th Infantry, and remained assigned to the 82nd Airborne Division (organic elements concurrently constituted and activated). It was relieved on 15 January 1959 from assignment to the 82nd Airborne Division and assigned to the 8th Infantry Division in Germany as part of a rotation that saw both 1-505th and 1-504th depart the 82nd. When the Pentomic era ended, 1-504th and 1-505th were reflagged respectively as 1st and 2nd Battalions (Airborne), 509th Infantry, elements of the 1st Brigade (Airborne), 8th Infantry Division on 1 April 1963. The colors of 1-505th returned to the 82nd, where they were reorganized and redesignated on 25 May 1964 as the 1st Battalion (Airborne), 505th Infantry, an element of the 3rd Brigade.

On 30 April 1965, the 3rd Brigade was alerted for combat as part of "Operation Power Pack", the defense of the Dominican Republic against communist insurgents. Within 18 hours, the first C-130 landed at San Isidro Airfield, Dominican Republic. After two months of bitter fighting, the 3rd Brigade returned to Fort Bragg, North Carolina.

On 24 July 1967, the 3rd Brigade deployed to Detroit, Michigan to assist local authorities in quelling a civil disturbance.

=== Vietnam War ===
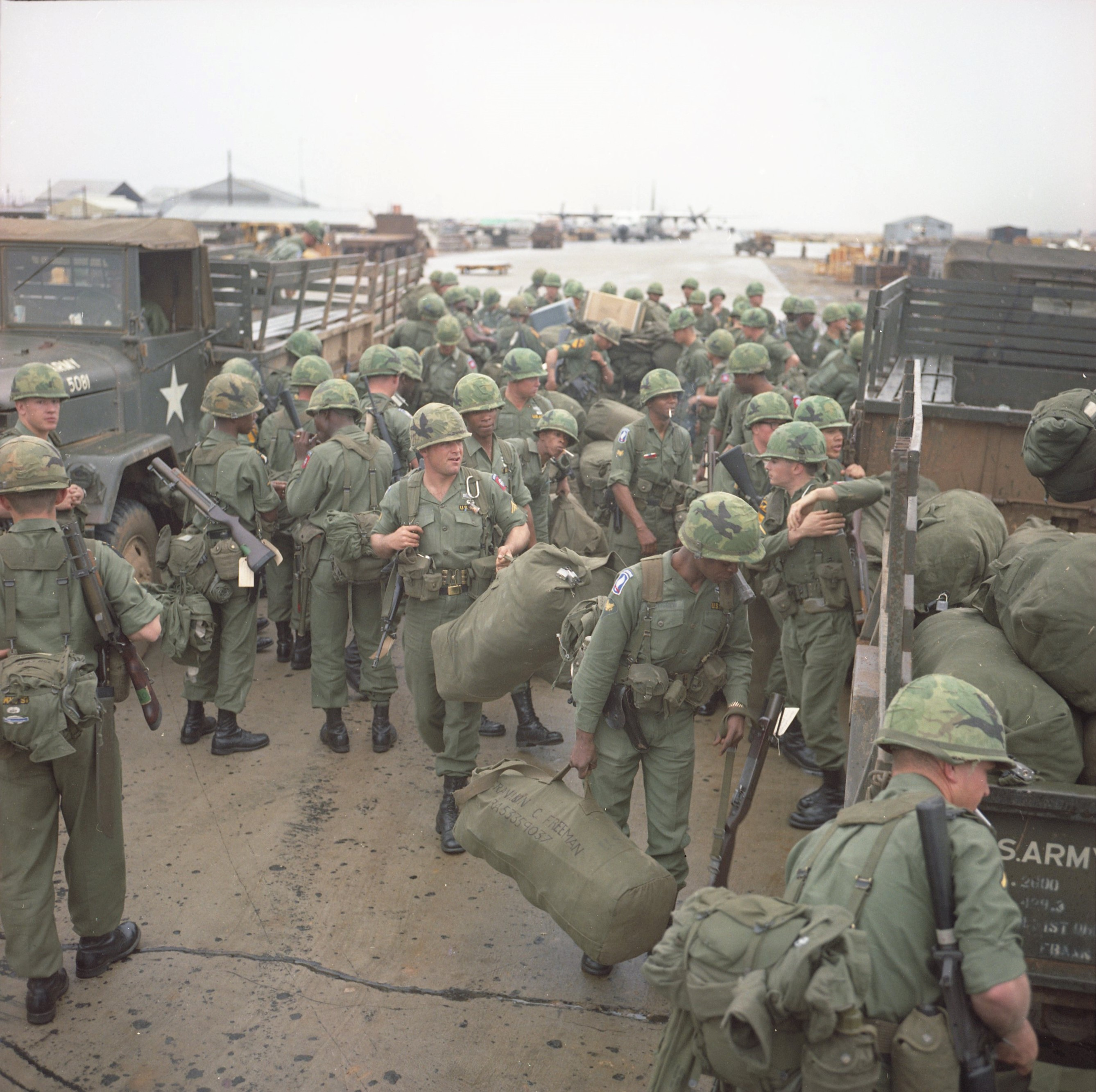
Members of Company "C", 1st Battalion, 505th Airborne Infantry board trucks after arriving at Chu Lai Air Base, 23 February 1968

Less than a year later, on 12 February 1968, the 3rd Brigade was alerted for deployment to South Vietnam in response to the Tet Offensive. Many members of the 3rd Brigade had recently returned from Vietnam and were not required, by the Army's own regulations, to return so soon if they did not wish to do so. About two-thirds of those eligible accepted transfers out of the brigade, which was back-filled from other units in the Division. The brigade deployed on "temporary change of station" orders with the expectation that it would return to Fort Bragg after the Tet emergency was resolved. When it was decided to retain the brigade in Vietnam its status was changed to "permanent change of station" and all soldiers who had deployed with the brigade were given the option of continuing to serve a full tour in Vietnam or to return to Fort Bragg. Most (except for junior officers and junior enlisted men) had already served at least one combat tour and opted to return to CONUS. The brigade was then filled with replacements from across USARV and from CONUS. Most replacements were not airborne qualified and the brigade eventually became "Airborne" in name only – just as the 101st Airborne Division and the 1st Airborne Brigade of the 1st Cavalry Division had already done during Vietnam service.

The infantry battalions assigned to the 3rd Brigade during its Vietnam tour were 1-505th, 2-505th, and 1-508th.

After 22 months of fighting, the brigade had helped secure the region south of the DMZ and redeployed to Fort Bragg in December 1969, the only brigade of the 82d Airborne Division to participate in the Vietnam War.

=== Post-Vietnam ===
Following its return from Vietnam, the 3rd Brigade again participated in controlling civil disturbances, deploying to Washington, D.C., in May 1971 to help local and federal officials in their efforts to keep demonstrators from disrupting the daily operations of the government. In August 1980, the brigade's 1st Battalion (Airborne), 505th Infantry was alerted and deployed to conduct civil disturbance duty at Fort Indiantown Gap, Pennsylvania during the Cuban refugee internment.

The 1st Battalion (Airborne), 505th Infantry deployed to the Middle East in March 1982 as the first United States member unit of the Multinational Forces and Observers (MFO) in Egypt's Sinai Peninsula. 1-505 PIR returned home in August 1982 from the most important peacekeeping mission in history.

In October 1983, the 3d Brigade deployed to the country of Grenada to evacuate US citizens and establish a US-aligned government during Operation Urgent Fury. B Company deployed initially, and took command of the island of Carriocou north of Grenada. The 1/505 was the 3rd Infantry Battalion to land on the island with the remainder of 2-505 air-landed on Point Salines airfield and captured General Hudson Austin on Westerhall Point as a direct result of an airmobile block and sweep which captured General Austin holding hostages in a waterfront haven. Once surrounded, Austin sent an emissary to LTC Keith Nightingale with the message "Let us leave or we will kill all the hostages." LTC Nightingale called in Cobra attack helicopters and sent back the message, "You and everyone and the house surrenders now, or else I will blow you and everyone in the house to Hell". General Hudson Austin capitulated at that point, thus ending the revolt. The 2-505 established bases around the rest of the island. The Battalion communications officer, Jim Adams, managed to secure the communications facility at the top of Mount Saint Catherine's and secure communications back to Fort Bragg, thereby establishing a communications links back to the Special Operations Division at Fort Bragg.

In September 1989, the 2-505th PIR was tasked to serve as part of the Multi-National Forces and observers in Egypt's Sinai Peninsula ending in March 1990. In December 1989, Company A, 3rd Battalion (Airborne) and HHC 3rd Battalion 81mm Mortar Platoon (Airborne), 505th Infantry participated in Operation Just Cause and assisted in overthrowing Manuel Noriega as the leader of Panama. This marked the first combat jump for the 505th since World War II.

In August 1990, the 505th was airlifted to Saudi Arabia as a part of Operation Desert Shield The ground phase of operation Desert Storm began 25 February 1991 and saw the brigade move north to conduct combat operations through the Euphrates River Valley. After eight months, the brigade had helped secure U.S. objectives and redeployed to Fort Bragg in April 1991.

In March 1994 the 505th Parachute Infantry Regiment was tasked to serve as part of the Multinational Force and Observers in Egypt's Sinai Peninsula. The 4th Battalion, 505th PIR, bearing the lineage of the WW II-era Company D, 505th PIR, was formed in the summer of 1994, and formally activated on 4 November 1994. Composed of 88% National Guard and Army Reserve Soldiers from 32 different states, as well as 12% Regular Army Paratroopers from the other battalions of the 505th PIR, the 4th Battalion, 505th PIR deployed to the Sinai from January 1995 through July 1995. Following its redeployment to Fort Bragg from the Sinai, the 4th Battalion was inactivated.

In September 1994, the 505th Parachute Infantry Regiment along with the rest of the 82d Airborne Division was alerted as part of Operation Restore Democracy. The 505th Parachute Infantry Regiment was scheduled to make a combat parachute jump, in order to help oust the military-led dictatorship and restore the democratically elected president, although Haiti had never had democracy in any form. The Division's first wave was in the air, with the 505th PIR loaded on aircraft awaiting takeoff, when the Haitian military dictator, upon learning the 82nd Airborne was on the way, agreed to step down and averted the invasion.

=== Operations Safe Haven and Safe Passage ===
On 12 December 1994, the 2-505 Parachute Infantry Regiment, deployed as part of Operations Safe Haven and Safe Passage. The battalion deployed from Fort Bragg as Task Force (TF) 2-Panther, augmented by 2nd Platoon, C-Co, 307th Engineers (2/C/307th), their habitually associated Engineer platoon, while serving as the Division Ready Force (DRF-1). Their mission was to restore order among approximately four thousand Cuban refugees who had attacked and injured a number of Air Force personnel while protesting their detainment at Empire Range along the Panama Canal. Task Force 2-Panther successfully established a base camp, reorganized four refugee camps, safeguarded the Cuban migrants, and actively patrolled the Panamanian Jungle around the refugee camps for two months. The Task Force also conducted three successful parachute training operations and observed a 92-degree Christmas Day in Panama before returning to Fort Bragg on 14 February 1995.

=== Operation Joint Guardian ===
In April 1999, TF 2-505 (with B/3-505) deployed to Albania for Operation "NOBLE ANVIL", positioned at Tirana airport. When NATO forces moved into Kosovo in June, 2-505 was in the lead, performing an air assault movement to establish Camp Bondsteel, before returning to the States in September.

=== Operation Helping Hand ===
In September, 2005, the 505th PIR deployed a brigade size element, minus the rear detachment, to New Orleans, Louisiana. Soldiers either flew or convoyed, for three days, to the city to assist in rescue and recovery operations of "displaced Americans", as well as restoring order to the city in the aftermath of Hurricane Katrina.

Upon arrival, paratroopers of the 505th PIR established a command and control environment for the senior leaders of the unit to work effectively in, making decisions that were vital to the restoration of law and order as well as being able to efficiently provide needed medical attention to the citizens of New Orleans. It was at this time that the unit was also reunited with Archbishop Philip Hannan who had served in the 505th PIR as a chaplain in World War II. Archbishop Hannan was sometimes referred to as the "Jumping Padre" and was involved in the liberation of several German concentration camps. Archbishop Hannan remained in the city during Katrina and was instrumental in recovery work immediately after the storm.

Subordinate units were directed to maintain different portions of the city; these units were tasked with guarding key infrastructure, stopping the looting and providing aid to the civilian population. One of the key buildings being guarded was the badly damaged Louisiana Superdome, guarded by the 3rd battalion of the 505th PIR; later redesignated the 5th Squadron 73rd Cavalry Regiment and 1st Squadron 73rd Cavalry Regiment respectively.

Emergency responders, police and other assets were given to COL Owens to manage and direct as necessary. COL Owens and his staff directed paratroopers and civilians to recover the remains of the dead, provide water rescues, provide vehicle detoxification sites and patrol the street for security purposes and, secure major civil and municipalities buildings. Army engineers were also sent to begin the cleanup of the area.

During the operation Hurricane Rita was heading through the same region that Katrina had just battered. COL Owens ordered that all paratroopers were to remain indoors during the storm, except for key personnel who needed to be outside. Engineers and commanders waited nervously, sending and receiving reports on whether the already badly damaged levies would hold. When the storm had ended, the levies had held.

The operation lasted for approximately thirty days, then the paratroopers of the 505th returned to Fort Bragg, North Carolina.

The paratroopers of the 505th PIR were awarded the Humanitarian Service Medal for service in Operation Hurricane Katrina.

=== Global War on Terrorism ===
From July 2002 to January 2003 the 505th PIR deployed to Afghanistan for Operation Enduring Freedom. Based in south eastern Afghanistan, the 505th helped curb the flow of Taliban fighters as they crossed over from Pakistan.

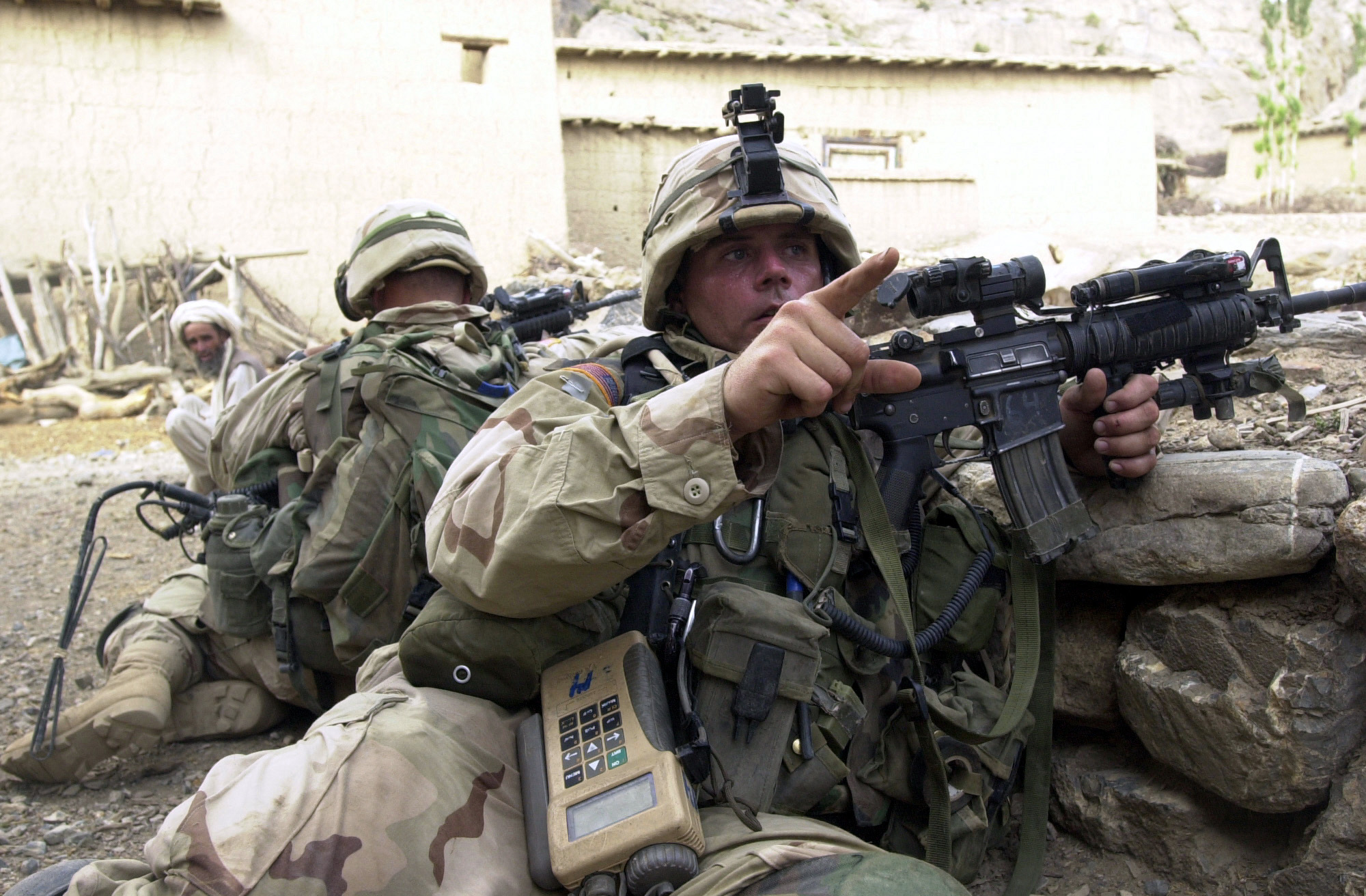
505th Infantry soldiers take up defensive positions during Operation Enduring Freedom.

From August 2003 to April 2004, the 505th PIR deployed as part of Operation Iraqi Freedom. The unit was sent to areas with heavy insurgent presence. On 4 September 2003 the 1-505th was stationed at Forward Operating Base Volturno on the outskirts of Fallujah and tasked with maintaining control of the area containing this important city. The 3-505th was stationed at FOB St. Michael, near Al Mahmoudiyah, known as "The Gateway to Baghdad". The 505th tried to operate a base inside the city of Fallujah on 23 April 2003, but there were violent protests. Two days later, on 30 April, the 82d Airborne was replaced by 2nd Troop (Fox) / U.S. 3rd Armored Cavalry Regiment. The 1-505th then deployed to Afghanistan. At the conclusion of this deployment, the 1-505th was then re-deployed to Fallujah, and were relieved by 2nd Battalion 1st Marines. The 1st Marine Division then did a Relief in Place (RIP) with the 82nd Airborne Division, and took over responsibility for Al-Anbar Province.

In early September 2004, the 1-505th was deployed to Eastern Afghanistan to provide security and support for Afghanistan's first free elections. Elements of the 2-505th PIR deployed in April 2006 for a 15-month tour with other elements of the reorganized 3-505th task force in support of Operation Iraqi Freedom. From August 2006 to November 2007, the 1-505th again deployed in support of Operation Iraqi Freedom. The brigade combat team deployed again in November 2008 for a one-year tour. The 505th PIR took over the responsibilities of the Global Response Force mission on 1 October 2010. 1-505th deployed in May 2011 to Feb 2012 in support of the Combined Joint Special Operations Task Force - Afghanistan, two of its paratroopers, SSG Donald Stacy and SPC James Butz, were killed. The 2-505th PIR deployed once again in support of Operation Enduring Freedom in June 2012. The battalion returned in late September 2012 and successfully finished its mission without loss of life.

Both 1st and 2nd Battalions deployed as components of 3rd Brigade Combat Team (BCT) "Panthers", 82nd Airborne Division to Iraq in support of Operation Inherent Resolve from January to September 2015.

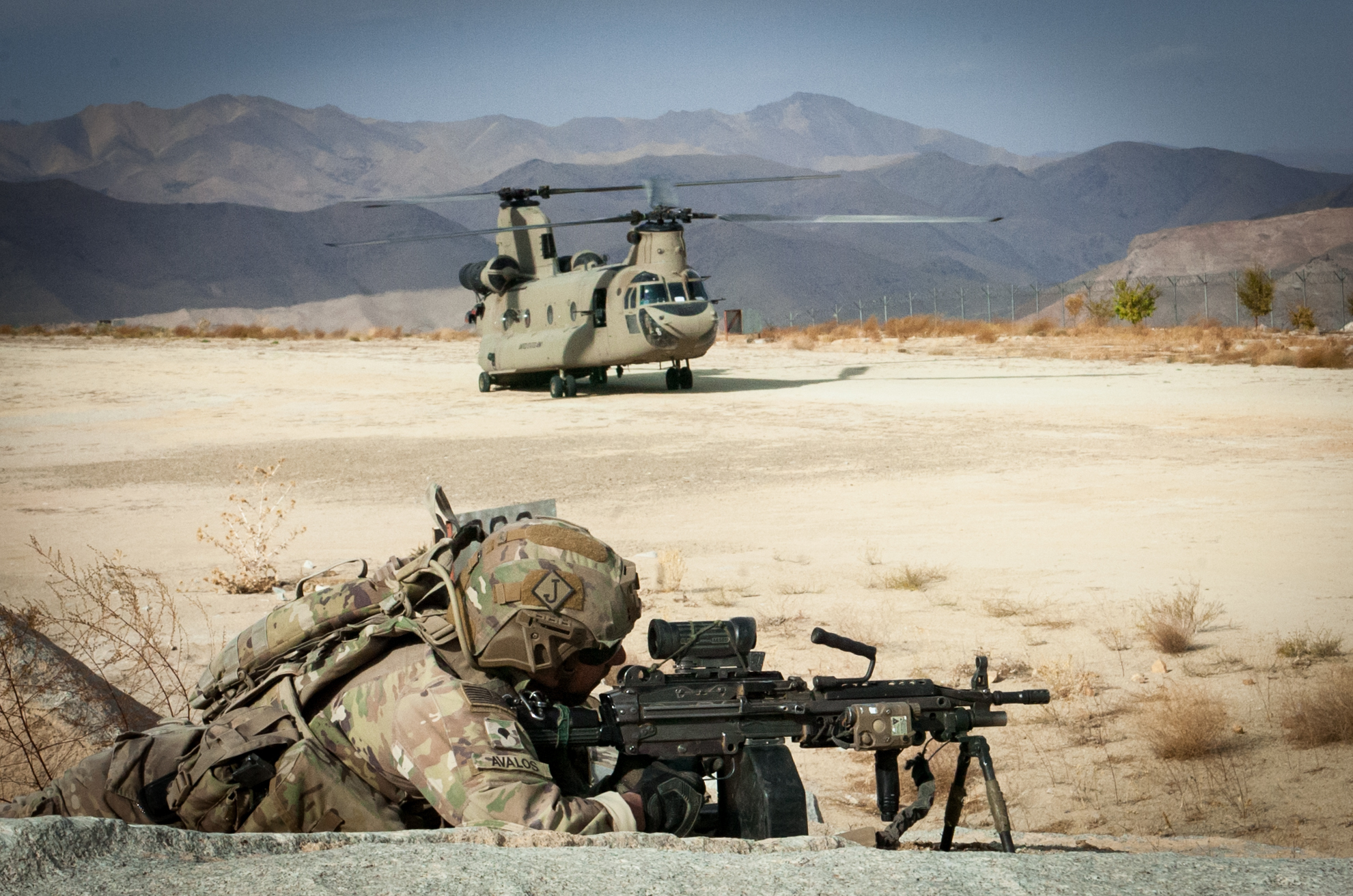
An automatic rifleman assigned to 1-505 PIR secures a landing zone for a CH-47 Chinook helicopter in Afghanistan.

Approximately 3,000 paratroopers from 3rd BCT, 82nd Airborne Division deployed to Afghanistan from July 2019 to March 2020, with soldiers from 1st and 2nd Battalions making up much of that manpower.

=== Eastern Europe ===
In May 2021, Panther Brigade paratroopers, including 1st and 2nd Battalions, flew non-stop over 4,000 miles aboard USAF C-17 Globemaster's from Fort Bragg, NC to jump into Nurmsi Drop Zone, Estonia as part of a Joint Forcible Entry (JFE) as part of Swift Defender 21, an airborne rapid deployment component to the larger Defender Europe 21 exercise. The exercise was accomplished with in-flight rigging of parachute harnesses and in-air refueling from USAF KC-10 Extender refueling tankers, and was described as "unique" thanks to the non-stop inter-continental distance flown and number of troops delivered to the drop zone.

In response to Russian military buildup near the border of Ukraine, the Panther Brigade (including 1st and 2nd Battalions) deployed on short notice to Poland in early February 2022, returning to Fort Bragg the following July.

== Distinctive unit insignia ==
The distinctive unit insignia was originally approved for the 505th Airborne Infantry Regiment on 24 January 1952. It was redesignated for the 505th Infantry on 20 May 1958.

The 505th PIR distinctive unit insignia is, according to the U.S. Army Institute of Heraldry

"A Silver color metal and enamel device 1 5/16 inches (3.3 cm) in height overall, consisting of a shield blazoned: Argent, four bendlets Azure surmounted by a winged Black panther salient inverted Proper, that part on the bendlets fimbriated of the first. On a wreath Argent and Azure, a winged arrowhead point down Gules, in front of a cloud Proper. Attached below the shield a Blue scroll turned Silver and inscribed "H-MINUS" in Silver."

The colors blue and white are used to symbolize Infantry. The black panther symbolizes stealth, speed and courage, all characteristics of a good Paratrooper. The wings are added to represent entry into combat via air, and the bendlets symbolize the unit's parachute drops into combat. The winged red arrowhead is used to represent the regiment's first combat attack in Sicily during World War II. The phrase "H-Minus" signifies the regiment's readiness prior to the start of the operation, or "H-Hour".

The official insignia is in fact not the insignia first designed by the men of the unit, which was simply a black panther on a shield, with the original motto, "Ready" inscribed below it. However, the Institute of Heraldry refused to approve the crest known by the men of the World War II 505th and replaced it with the above-referenced insignia.
