= Operation Vulture =

Proposed US intervention in French Indochina

Coordinates: 21°23′13″N 103°0′56″E

Operation Vulture (French: Opération Vautour) was the name of the proposed U.S. operation that would rescue French forces at the Battle of Dien Bien Phu in 1954 via B-29 raids based in the Philippines. The French garrison had been surrounded by the Viet Minh during the First Indochina War. When the British government refused to give its support (something that Eisenhower required for the operation to proceed), the plan was cancelled and as a result the French Army organised Operation Condor, an attempt to weaken the Viet Minh artillery's assaults against the besieged French Union garrison.

== Background ==
Viet Minh forces under General Võ Nguyên Giáp surrounded and besieged the French, who were unaware of the Viet Minh's possession of heavy artillery, including anti-aircraft guns. The attack that formally began the battle was launched 13 March 1954. French artillery outposts fell within hours, and a dismal trickle of wounded survivors into Dien Bien Phu's garrison hospital began. The French tried to hit back with artillery and airpower, including some 30 US C-119 Flying Boxcars which had been modified to drop napalm on the Viet Minh artillery and flown mainly by American employees of Civil Air Transport, the contract airline founded by Maj. Gen. Claire Lee Chennault, the head of the World War II Flying Tigers. Dien Bien Phu could be supplied only via airdrop, and dropping and retrieving supplies became difficult as Viet Minh artillery shrank the effective size of the drop zone. On 27 March, French Col. Jean-Louis Nicot, the officer in charge of the aerial resupply effort, had to raise the drop altitude from 2,000 feet to 8,000 feet. Drop zone accuracy declined, and some supplies inevitably fell into Viet Minh hands. The French, with the encouragement of some US officials based in Saigon, pressed hard for the US to launch an overwhelming air strike to save Dien Bien Phu.

== French-American meeting ==
Giap's initial assault began on March 13, 1954. General Paul Ély, the French Chief of Staff, arrived in Washington to plead the French case to US policy-makers. on March 20. Discussions involved General Ély, U.S. Secretary of State John Foster Dulles and Admiral Arthur W. Radford, Chairman of the U.S. Joint Chiefs of Staff. At a meeting in Washington on 20 March 1954, Admiral Radford proposed to General Ély a plan calling for United States to use 60 B-29 bombers in the Philippines together with the aircraft of the 7th Fleet based in the Gulf of Tonkin to bomb the Vietminh forces besieging the French at Dien Bien Phu. Ély came away from the meeting with the impression that the Americans would intervene and promptly reported to Paris that he had Radford's assurances to that effect.

== The plan ==
The plan included as many as 98 B-29s from Okinawa and the Philippines that would drop 1,400 tonnes of bombs on positions held by the Viet Minh. Another version of the plan envisioned sending 60 B-29s from US bases in the region, supported by as many as 150 fighters launched from US Seventh Fleet carriers, to bomb Giap's positions.

The plan included an option to use up to three small atomic weapons on the Viet Minh positions in support of the French. The Joint Chiefs of Staff drew up plans to deploy tactical atomic weapons, U.S. carriers sailed to the Gulf of Tonkin, and reconnaissance flights over Dien Bien Phu were conducted during the negotiations. Radford, the top American military officer, gave this nuclear option his backing. US B-29s, B-36s, and B-47s could have executed a nuclear strike, as could carrier aircraft from the Seventh Fleet. Admiral Radford was the leading voice within the government for Operation Vulture, citing a study that three tactical atomic bombs "properly employed" would decisively smash the Vietminh forces besieging the French at Dien Bien Phu, and thereby turn a certain defeat into a victory.

The U.S. Air Force's commanding officer, General Nathan F. Twining, endorsed Vulture, but General Matthew Ridgway of the U.S. Army was stoutly opposed. Ridgway stated that air power alone could not save the French garrison at Dien Bien Phu and argued that only the commitment of seven U.S. Army divisions could save the French. Ridgway further contended that if the United States intervened in Vietnam it was almost a given that China would likewise intervene. Dien Bien Phu was located in the northern part of Vietnam that put it into the proximity of China, and China had intervened in the Korean War in 1950 on the grounds that the United Nations advance into North Korea was a threat to its security. If China intervened in Vietnam, Ridgway asserted the U.S. Army would need twelve divisions in Vietnam to have a chance of victory. Ridgway concluded that "Indochina is devoid of decisive military objectives" and fighting another land war against China "would be a serious diversion of limited U.S. capabilities". Ridgway thought that Radford as an admiral was far too dismissive of Chinese power and that he was blind to the political dangers of the United States fighting again against China in less than a year after the end of the Korean War, causing much discord on the Joint Chiefs of Staff. Ridgway was the leader of a faction within the U.S. Army known as the "Never Again Club" that regarded the Korean War which ended in a draw as an unsatisfactory outcome from the American perspective, and were strongly opposed to fighting another land war in Asia, especially against the Chinese.

Both the Vice President, Richard Nixon, and the Secretary of State, John Foster Dulles, were all for Vulture and lobbied Eisenhower hard to accept it, arguing that it was essential to stop Communism in Vietnam. Eisenhower himself felt much guilt over the atomic bombings of Hiroshima and Nagasaki in 1945, and during one meeting told Admiral Radford and General Twining: "You boys must be crazy. We can't use those awful things against Asians for a second time in less than ten years. My God!" Eisenhower finally agreed to carry out Vulture, but if Congress gave its approval first and if Great Britain agreed to join in. At a press conference Eisenhower stated: "There is going to be no involvement of America in war unless it is the result of the constitutional process that is placed upon Congress to declare it. Now, let us have that clear". Eisenhower was referring to the clause in the American constitution that gave the power to declare war to Congress.

The leaders of both houses of Congress gave an equivocal answer to Eisenhower's request for approval, opposed to the idea of Vulture as an American operation, but willing to accept it as an Anglo-American operation. The congressional leaders rejected Nixon's lobbying to pass a resolution giving the president the power to use nuclear weapons in Vietnam at his own discretion, but were willing to reconsider if the British joined in. One of the congressional leaders opposed to the resolution was the Senate Minority Leader Lyndon B. Johnson. The American journalist Stanley Karnow wrote that it was a major irony that Johnson in 1954 was opposed to passing a resolution giving Eisenhower the power to wage war in Indochina. The resolution that Johnson was against in 1954 was very similar to the Gulf of Tonkin Resolution that he successfully sought as president in 1964. Eisenhower for his part felt that it was essential that Britain join in, saying that based on his experiences as a general in World War Two that: "Without allies and associates, the leader is just an adventurer, like Genghis Khan". Eisenhower's chief of staff, Sherman Adams, later told Karnow in an interview in 1981: "Having avoided one total war with Red China the year before in Korea, when he had United Nations support, he was in no mood to provoke another in Indochina...without the British and other Western allies".

Beyond that, Eisenhower was dissatisfied with French policies in Vietnam. In 1949, the French had granted nominal independence to Vietnam, creating the State of Vietnam headed by the Emperor Bao Dai. In February 1950 the State of Vietnam was recognized by the United States as the legitimate government of Vietnam with Donald R. Heath being appointed the first American ambassador in Saigon. However it was widely known that the State of Vietnam was a sham with the Emperor a puppet leader and French colonial civil servants still in charge. The Emperor had no control over his military and the economy, both of which were the dominion of French officials. Despite the nominal independence of the State of Vietnam, the country was in effect still a French colony and Eisenhower had often pressed the French to no avail to give more power to the Emperor Bao Dai, arguing that this was the best way to curb the appeal of the Communist Vietminh. From Eisenhower's viewpoint to intervene without promises from the French to give more independence to the State of Vietnam would commit the United States to fighting a colonial war on behalf of France.

Eisenhower wrote the British Prime Minister Winston Churchill a letter urging the United Kingdom to intervene, saying the situation was no different from the 1930s when other nations "by not acting in unit and in time" failed to stop Nazi Germany. Dulles was dispatched to London to make the case for intervention, but he was coldly received. The Foreign Secretary, Sir Anthony Eden, who was to serve as co-chairman of the upcoming Geneva Conference alongside the Soviet Foreign Minister Vyacheslav Molotov, was opposed to intervention, telling Dulles that his country would not be "hustled into injudicious military decisions". In a speech before the House of Commons, Churchill stated that Great Britain "was not prepared to give any undertakings...in Indochina in advance of the results of Geneva". At most, Churchill and Eden promised Dulles that Britain was prepared to join a NATO-type organization for Southeast Asia, which was later created in September 1954 as the Southeast Asia Treaty Organization (SEATO).

== Decision against the operation ==
Vice-president Nixon, a so-called "hawk" on Vietnam, suggested that the U.S. might have to "put American boys in". President Eisenhower made American participation contingent on British support, but London was opposed. Eisenhower also felt that the airstrike alone would not decide the battle. He also expressed concerns that the French Air Force was insufficiently developed for this sort of operation and did not want to escalate U.S. involvement in the war by using American pilots. Finally, the British Prime Minister Winston Churchill rejected the idea of British intervention in Vietnam, which killed Vulture. In the end, convinced that the political risks outweighed the possible benefits, Eisenhower decided against the intervention.

== See also ==
- Franco-American relations
- Suez Crisis
- Fracture Jaw (an unimplemented plan that would have made nuclear weapons available for use in the Vietnam War)

== Books and articles ==
- Karnow, Stanley (1983). Vietnam A History. Viking. ISBN 0140265473.
- Langguth, A.J. (2000). Our Vietnam The War 1954-1975. Simon & Schuster. ISBN 0743212312.
- Wicker, Thomas (2014). Dwight D. Eisenhower. New York: Times Books. ISBN 978-1466871809.
