= Paul Ély =

French general

Paul Ely
- General Ely 1950
- Born: 17 December 1897; Salonica, Greece
- Died: 16 January 1975 (aged 77); Paris, France
- Military career
- Allegiance: France
- Branch: French Army
- Service years: 1919–1961
- Conflicts: World War II; First Indochina War

Paul Henri Romuald Ély (17 December 1897 – 16 January 1975) was a French General and former Chief of the Defence Staff.

== Early life and education ==
He was the son of Henri Ely, a civil servant and Therese (née Coste). He attended the Lycée de Best.

== Army career ==
Ely attended the Ecole Spéciale Militaire de Saint-Cyr and was commissioned as a lieutenant in 1919. He was promoted to captain in 1930 and then commandant in 1938. He was promoted to lieutenant colonel in the Free French forces in 1942 and full colonel in 1944. In 1946 he was promoted to general.

=== Indochina ===
Ely was appointed as the first Chief of the Defence Staff and served in this role from August 1953 to June 1954.

From 20 to 26 March 1954, Ely visited Washington D.C. for previously scheduled high-level talks that coincided with the increasingly dire straits for the French forces in the Battle of Dien Bien Phu. In the course of Ely's visit, discussions regarding potential direct US air support for the French garrison at Dien Bien Phu took place and these became known as Operation Vulture. Vulture apparently originated as a carrier-based United States Navy mission but evolved into a plan for a single strike by the entire B–29 fleet of United States Air Force (USAF) Far East Air Force Bomber Command, with 98 B–29s flying from Clark Air Base to make a raid against Viet Minh targets around Dien Bien Phu. Navy fighters from two carriers already positioned near the Gulf of Tonkin would have provided escort and cover. The USAF prepared for the Operation Vulture contingency. Ely apparently left Washington under the impression that the French could request that the Americans make such a strike.

On 4 April Ely cabled Gen. Jean Étienne Valluy, head of the French military mission in Washington, to communicate to Admiral Radford the French government's request that the United States execute the air strike that Admiral Arthur W. Radford and Ely had discussed to relieve Viet Minh pressure on Dien Bien Phu. French foreign minister Georges Bidault delivered the same message to Douglas Dillon, the US ambassador to France. The US Government advised the French on 6 April that US involvement would only be contemplated with the direct participation of the United Kingdom.

Ely was appointed as commander in chief in Indochina on 2 June 1954 to replace General Henri Navarre, he departed for Saigon on 6 June 1954 after telling a friend that "this is the worst mishap of my career."

On 28 June after discussions in Paris with new Prime Minister Pierre Mendès-France, General Ely ordered evacuation of French forces from positions in the southern part of the Red River Delta, leaving the French with only a narrow corridor between Hanoi and Haiphong.

On 13 December Ely and US Ambassador J. Lawton Collins reached an "understanding on development and training of autonomous Viet-Nam forces." Under the agreement, Military Assistance Advisory Group would assume full responsibility for organizing and training the South Vietnamese military while still recognizing the overall French military authority. The French were to grant "full autonomy" to the South Vietnamese armed forces by 1 July 1955. The Americans and French did not consult with the Vietnamese while setting up the agreement.

In a meeting in Paris on 18 December 1954 with Prime Minister Mendès-France and Anthony Eden, the British foreign secretary, Ely expressed his views of South Vietnamese premier Ngo Dinh Diem as an "extremely pig-headed man who became more so under pressure" and that he and Collins "were now virtually convinced that it was hopeless to expect anything of Diem."

Ely left South Vietnam at the end of May 1955.

=== Post Indochina ===
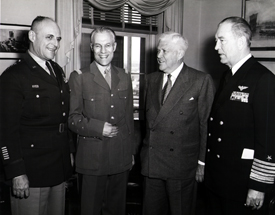
General Matthew Ridgway, General Ely, Secretary of Defense Charles Erwin Wilson and Admiral Arthur W. Radford on 22 March 1954

Ely was reappointed as Chief of Staff in March 1956. Ely was sympathetic to the putschists during the May 1958 crisis in France and on 16 May 1958 submitted his resignation which was accepted the next day.

Ely was reappointed as Chief of Staff in June 1958 after Charles de Gaulle assumed power and established the Fifth Republic. In July 1958 at de Gaulle's instigation he purged the army of some of the extremist elements who had led the May revolt.

Ely retired from the Army in 1961.

== Later life ==
Ely died on 16 January 1975.
