= Matthew Ridgway =

United States Army general (1895–1993)

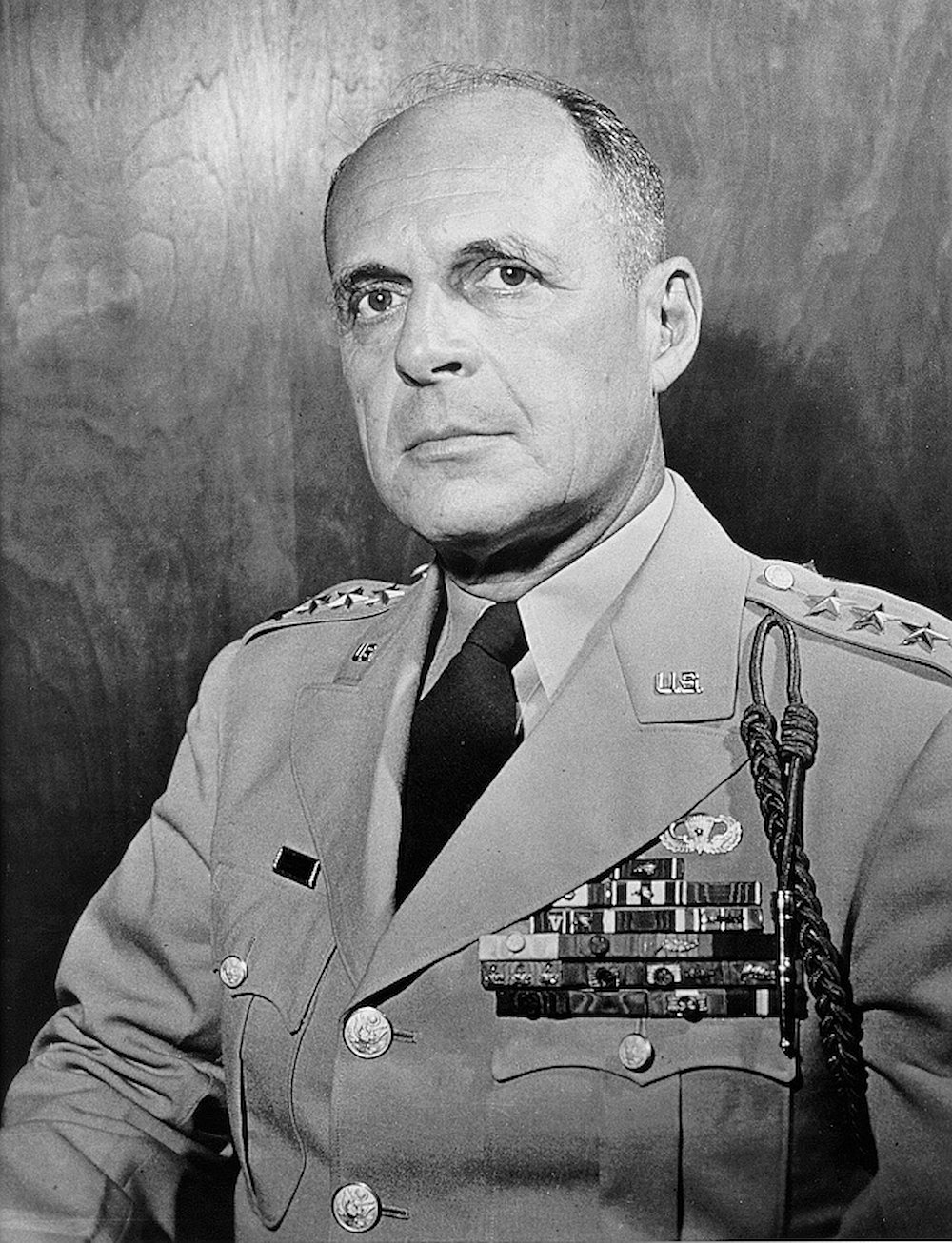
- Ridgway in 1951

19th Chief of Staff of the United States Army
- In office 15 August 1953 – 29 June 1955
- President: Dwight D. Eisenhower
- Preceded by: Joseph Lawton Collins
- Succeeded by: Maxwell D. Taylor

2nd Supreme Allied Commander Europe
- In office 30 May 1952 – 11 July 1953
- President: Harry S. Truman; Dwight D. Eisenhower
- Preceded by: Dwight D. Eisenhower
- Succeeded by: Alfred Gruenther

2nd Supreme Commander for the Allied Powers
- In office 11 April 1951 – 28 April 1952
- President: Harry S. Truman
- Preceded by: Douglas MacArthur
- Succeeded by: Mark W. Clark (as commander of the Far East Command)

Personal details
- Born: Matthew Bunker Ridgway; 3 March 1895 Fort Monroe, Virginia, U.S.
- Died: 26 July 1993 (aged 98) Fox Chapel, Pennsylvania, U.S.
- Resting place: Arlington National Cemetery
- Awards: Distinguished Service Cross (2); Army Distinguished Service Medal (4); Silver Star (2); Legion of Merit (2); Bronze Star Medal w/ Valor Device (2); Purple Heart; Presidential Medal of Freedom; Congressional Gold Medal; Taegeuk Order of Military Merit
- Nickname(s): "Matt" "Old Iron Tits"

Military service
- Allegiance: United States
- Branch/service: United States Army
- Years of service: 1917–1955
- Rank: General
- Unit: Infantry Branch
- Commands: Chief of Staff of the United States Army; Supreme Allied Commander Europe; Supreme Commander for the Allied Powers; United Nations Command; Eighth Army; Caribbean Command; XVIII Airborne Corps; 82nd Airborne Division; 82nd Infantry Division; 15th Infantry Regiment
- Battles/wars: Mexican Border Service; World War I; Banana Wars; Occupation of Nicaragua; World War II; Operation Husky; Operation Overlord; Operation Market Garden; Battle of the Bulge; Operation Varsity; Western Allied invasion of Germany; Korean War; Battle of Chipyong-ni; First and Second Battles of Wonju; Third Battle of Seoul; Fifth Phase Offensive; UN May–June 1951 counteroffensive

Matthew Bunker Ridgway (3 March 1895 – 26 July 1993) was a senior officer in the United States Army, who served as Supreme Allied Commander Europe (1952–1953) and the 19th Chief of Staff of the United States Army (1953–1955). Although he saw no combat service in World War I, he was intensively involved in World War II, where he was the first Commanding General (CG) of the 82nd Airborne Division, leading it in action in Sicily, Italy and Normandy, before taking command of the newly formed XVIII Airborne Corps in August 1944. He held the latter post until the end of the war in mid-1945, commanding the corps in the Battle of the Bulge, Operation Varsity and the Western Allied invasion of Germany.

Ridgway held several major commands after World War II and is most well-known for resurrecting the United Nations (UN) war effort during the Korean War. Several historians have credited Ridgway for turning the war around in favor of the UN side. He also persuaded President Dwight D. Eisenhower to refrain from direct military intervention in the First Indochina War to support French colonial forces, thereby essentially delaying the United States' Vietnam War by over a decade. He received the Presidential Medal of Freedom on 12 May 1986. Ridgway died in 1993 at the age of 98.

== Early life and education ==
Ridgway was born 3 March 1895, in Fort Monroe, Virginia, to Colonel Thomas Ridgway, an artillery officer, and Ruth Starbuck (Bunker) Ridgway. He lived in various military bases all throughout his childhood. He later remarked that his "earliest memories are of guns and marching men, of rising to the sound of the reveille gun and lying down to sleep at night while the sweet, sad notes of 'Taps' brought the day officially to an end". He graduated in 1912 from English High School in Boston and applied to United States Military Academy at West Point because he thought that would please his father (who was a West Point graduate).

Ridgway failed the entrance exam the first time due to his inexperience with mathematics, but after intensive self-study he succeeded the second time. At West Point he served as a manager of the football team. He graduated from there, 56th in a class of 139, on 20 April 1917, two weeks after the American entry into World War I, and received his commission as a second lieutenant in the Infantry Branch of the United States Army.

== Early military career ==
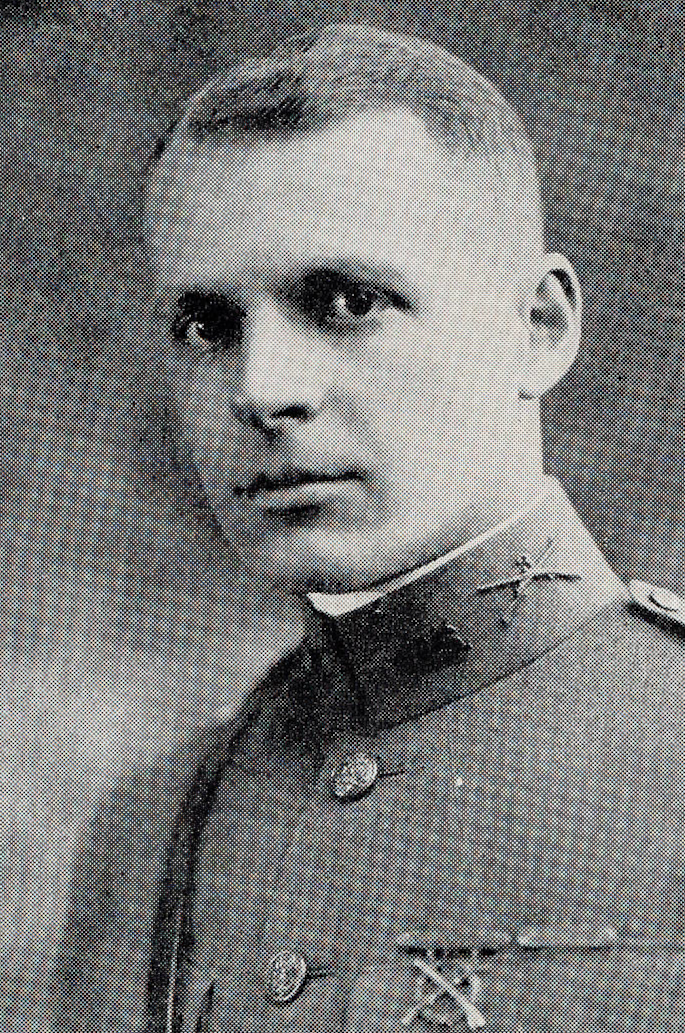
Ridgway as United States Military Academy Graduate Manager of Athletics c. 1923

Beginning his career during World War I, Ridgway was assigned to duty on the border with Mexico as a member of the 3rd Infantry Regiment, and then to the West Point faculty as an instructor in Spanish. He was disappointed that he was not assigned to combat duty during the war, feeling that "the soldier who had had no share in this last great victory of good over evil would be ruined".

During 1924 and 1925 Ridgway attended the company officers' course at the United States Army Infantry School in Fort Benning, Georgia, after which he was a company commander in the 15th Infantry Regiment in Tianjin, China. This was followed by a posting to Nicaragua, where he helped supervise free elections in 1927.

In 1930, Ridgway became an advisor to the Governor-General of the Philippines. He graduated from the Army Command and General Staff School at Fort Leavenworth, Kansas, in 1935 and from the Army War College at Washington Barracks, District of Columbia, in 1937. During the 1930s he served as Assistant Chief of Staff of VI Corps, Deputy Chief of Staff of the Second Army, and Assistant Chief of Staff of the Fourth Army. General George C. Marshall, the Chief of Staff of the United States Army, assigned Ridgway to the War Plans Division shortly after the outbreak of World War II in Europe in September 1939.

== World War II ==
After being promoted to lieutenant colonel on 1 July 1940, he served in the War Plans Division until January 1942, and was promoted to Brigadier general that month, after being promoted to temporary colonel on 11 December the month before following the Japanese attack on Pearl Harbor. In February 1942 he was assigned as Assistant Division Commander of the 82nd Infantry Division, which was then in the process of formation. The division was under the command of Major general Omar Bradley, a fellow infantryman whom Ridgway highly respected. The two men trained the thousands of men joining the division over the next few months. In August, two months after Bradley's reassignment to command of the 28th Infantry Division, Ridgway was promoted to Major general and was given command of the 82nd Division. The 82nd, having finished all of its basic training and already established an excellent combat record in World War I, had earlier been chosen to become one of the army's five new airborne divisions. The conversion of an entire infantry division to airborne status was an unprecedented step for the United States Army, and required much training, testing, and experimentation. Thus the division was, on 15 August 1942, redesignated as the 82nd Airborne Division.

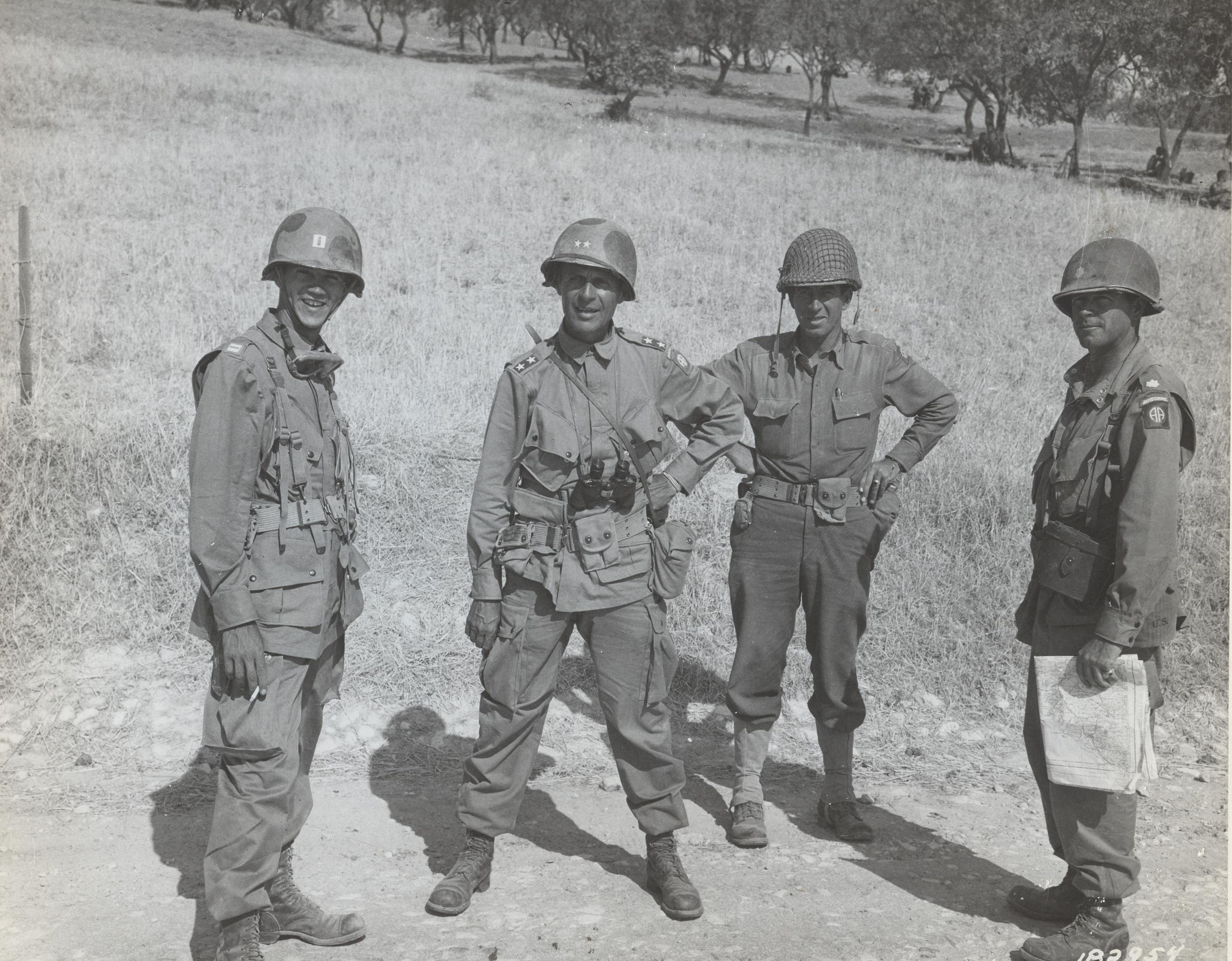
Ridgway and members of his staff outside Ribera, Sicily, 25 July 1943. To Ridgway's right is his aide, Captain Don C. Faith Jr.

Initially composed of the 325th, 326th and 327th Infantry Regiments, all of which were due to be converted into glider infantry, the 327th was soon transferred out of the 82nd to help form the 101st Airborne Division, commanded by Major general William C. Lee. Unlike his men, Ridgway did not first go through airborne jump school before joining the division. He successfully converted the 82nd into a combat-ready airborne division and remained in command and eventually earned his paratrooper wings. To replace the 327th, Ridgway received the 504th Parachute Infantry Regiment, commanded by Colonel Theodore Dunn, later replaced by Lieutenant colonel Reuben Tucker. In February 1943 the 326th was also transferred out and replaced by the 505th Parachute Infantry Regiment, under Colonel James M. Gavin. In April the 82nd, which in Ridgway's mind had received only a third the training time given to most divisions, was sent to North Africa to prepare for the invasion of Sicily.

=== Italian campaign ===
Ridgway helped plan the airborne element of the invasion of Sicily. The invasion, which took place in July 1943, was spearheaded by Gavin's 505th Parachute Infantry Regiment (reinforced into the 505th Parachute Regimental Combat Team by the 3rd Battalion of Tucker's 504th). Despite some successes, Sicily nearly saw an end to the airborne division. Due mainly to circumstances beyond Ridgway's control the 82nd suffered heavy casualties in Sicily, including the division's Assistant Division Commander, Brigadier general Charles L. Keerans. During the 504th's drop on the morning of 9 July, which was widely scattered due to friendly fire, Ridgway had to report to Lieutenant general George S. Patton, commander of the Seventh United States Army (under whose command the 82nd fell), that, out of the more than 5,300 paratroopers of the 82nd Airborne Division who had jumped into Sicily, he had fewer than 400 under his control.

During the planning for the invasion of the Italian mainland, the 82nd was tasked with taking Rome by coup de main in Operation Giant II. Ridgway strongly objected to this unrealistic plan, which would have dropped the 82nd on the outskirts of the Rome in the midst of two German heavy divisions. The operation was canceled only hours before launch. The 82nd did, however, play a significant role in the invasion of Italy at Salerno in September which, but for a drop by Ridgway's two parachute regiments, may well have seen the Allies pushed back into the sea. The 82nd Airborne Division subsequently saw brief service in the early stages of the Italian Campaign, helping the Allies to break through the Volturno Line in October. The division then returned to occupation duties in the recently liberated Italian city of Naples and saw little further action thereafter and in November departed Italy for Northern Ireland. Lieutenant general Mark W. Clark, commander of the Fifth United States Army, a fellow graduate of the West Point class of 1917, referring to Ridgway as an "outstanding battle soldier, brilliant, fearless and loyal", who had "trained and produced one of the finest Fifth Army outfits", was unwilling to give up either Ridgway or the 82nd. As a compromise, Colonel Tucker's 504th Parachute Infantry Regiment, along with supporting units, was retained in Italy, to be sent to rejoin the rest of the 82nd Airborne Division as soon as possible.

=== France and Germany ===
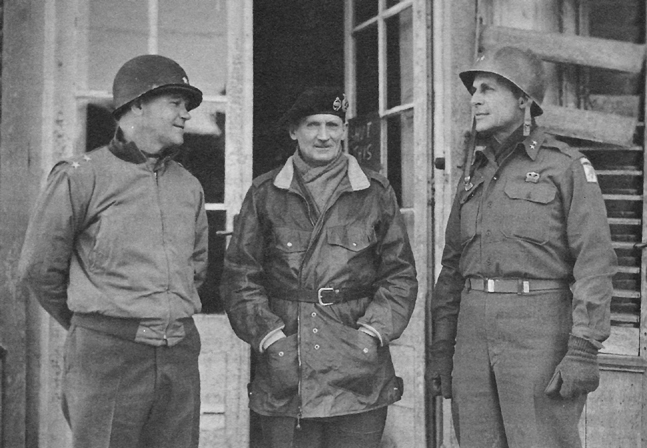
From left to right: Major General J. Lawton Collins, British Field Marshal Sir Bernard Montgomery and Ridgway, December 1944

In late 1943 and in the early months of 1944, Ridgway helped plan the airborne operations of Operation Overlord, codename for the Allied invasion of Normandy, where he argued, successfully, for the two American airborne divisions taking part in the invasion, the 82nd and the inexperienced 101st, still commanded by Major general Lee (later replaced by Brigadier general Maxwell D. Taylor, formerly commander of the 82nd Airborne Division Artillery), to be increased in strength from two parachute regiments and a single glider regiment (although with only two battalions) to three parachute regiments, and for the glider regiment to have a strength of three battalions. In the Battle of Normandy, he jumped with his troops, who fought for 33 days in advancing to Saint-Sauveur-le-Vicomte near Cherbourg (St Sauveur was liberated on 14 June 1944). Relieved from front-line duty in early July, the 82nd Airborne Division had, during the severe fighting in the Normandy bocage, suffered 46 percent casualties.

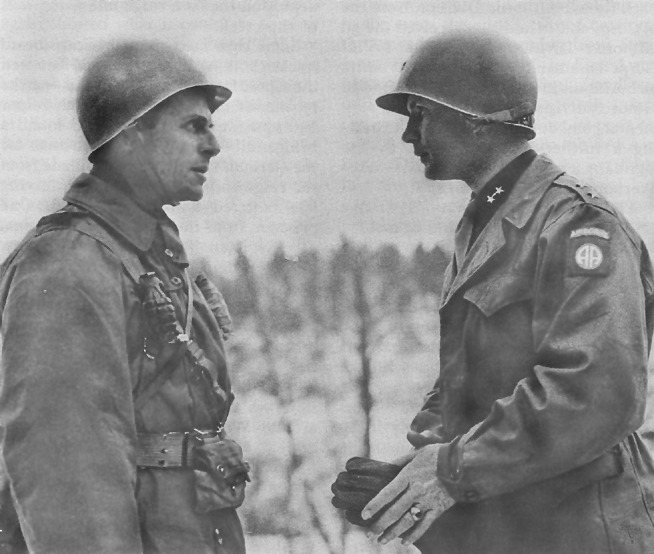
Ridgway and Major General James M. Gavin during the Battle of the Bulge, 19 December 1944

In August 1944, Ridgway was given the command of XVIII Airborne Corps. Command of the 82nd Airborne Division passed to Gavin. The first operation involving Ridgway was Operation Market Garden where the 101st Airborne Division dropped near Eindhoven to secure the bridges between Eindhoven and Veghel on the road to Arnhem. Ridgway dropped with his troops and was in the forefront of the division's part of the fighting. The XVIII Airborne Corps helped stop and push back German troops during the Battle of the Bulge in December. In March 1945, with the British 6th Airborne Division and United States 17th Airborne Division under his command, he led the corps into Germany during Operation Varsity, the airborne component of Operation Plunder, and was wounded in the shoulder by German grenade fragments on 24 March 1945. On 4 June 1945, he was promoted to the temporary rank of Lieutenant general.

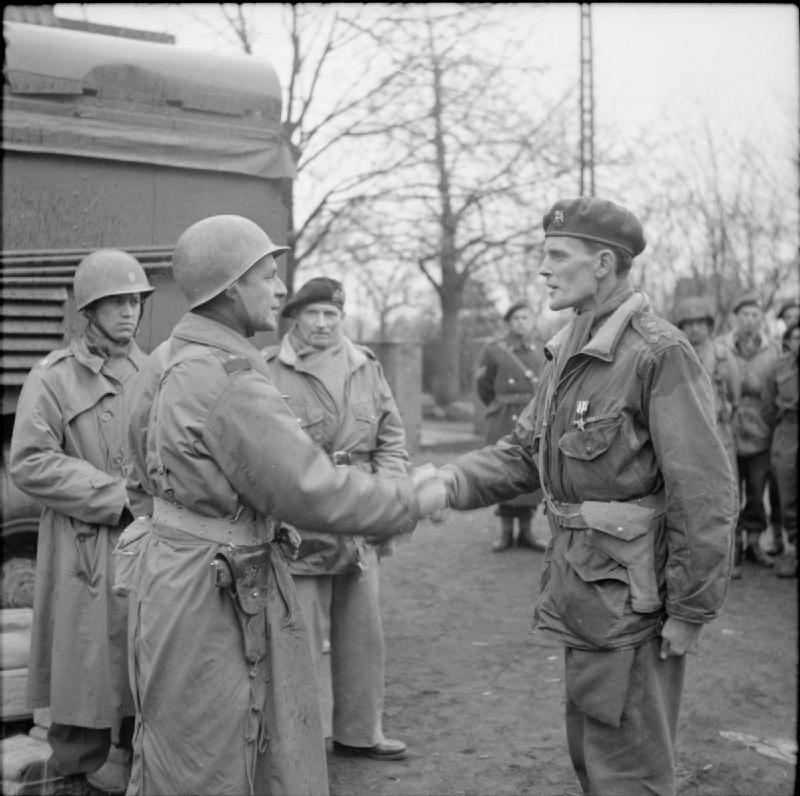
Ridgway (left) decorating British Brigadier James Hill with the Silver Star, March 1945. Pictured also in the middle is Field Marshal Sir Bernard Montgomery

At war's end, Ridgway was on a plane headed for a new assignment in the Pacific theater of war, under General of the Army Douglas MacArthur, with whom he had served while a captain at the United States Military Academy at West Point.

Ridgway spoke highly of British Field Marshal Sir Bernard Montgomery, stating that his time serving under Montgomery was "most satisfying" and that "He gave me the general outline of what he wanted and let me completely free". Ridgway noted that while Montgomery was a "free spirit who was sometimes a bit hard to restrain", he also referred to Montgomery as "a first-class professional officer of great ability... and Monty could produce... I don't know anybody who could give me more complete support than Monty did when I was under British command twice... I had no trouble with Monty at all".

=== Interbellum ===
Ridgway was a commander at Luzon until October 1945 when the XVIII Airborne Corps was disbanded. He was then given command of the US forces in the Mediterranean Theater, with the title Deputy Supreme Allied Commander, Mediterranean. From 1946 to 1948, he served as the US Army representative on the military staff committee of the United Nations. He was placed in charge of the Caribbean Command in 1948, controlling US forces in the Caribbean, and in 1949 was assigned to the position of Deputy Chief of Staff for Administration under then Chief of Staff of the United States Army, General J. Lawton Collins.

== Korean War ==
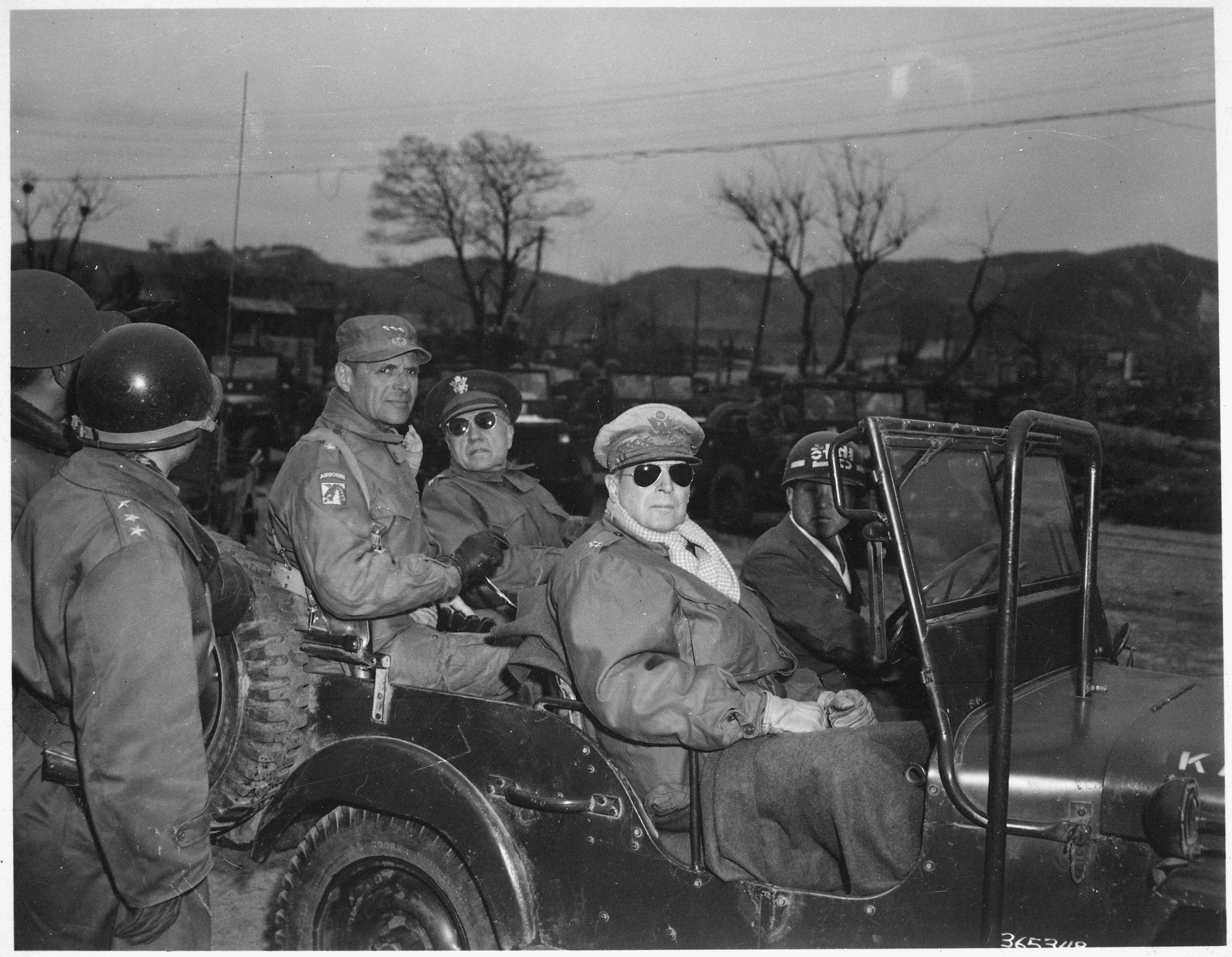
From left to right: Ridgway, Major General Doyle Hickey, and General of the Army Douglas MacArthur in a jeep at a UN command post, April 1951

=== Eighth Army Command ===
Ridgway's most important command assignment occurred in 1950 after the death of Lieutenant general Walton Walker on 23 December. Ridgway was assigned as Walker's replacement in command of the Eighth United States Army, which had been deployed in South Korea in response to the invasion by North Korea in June of that year.

When Ridgway took command of Eighth Army, the Army was in a tactical retreat, after its strong foray into North Korea had been met with an unexpected and overwhelming Communist Chinese advance in the Battle of the Ch'ongch'on River. Ridgway was successful in turning around the morale of Eighth Army.

Ridgway was unfazed by the demeanor of MacArthur, then overall commander of UN forces in Korea. MacArthur gave Ridgway a latitude in operations he had not given his predecessor. After Ridgway landed in Tokyo on Christmas Day 1950 to discuss the operational situation with MacArthur, the latter assured his new commander that the actions of Eighth Army were his to conduct as he saw fit. Ridgway was encouraged to retire to successive defensive positions, as was currently under way, and hold Seoul as long as he could, but not if doing so meant that Eighth Army would be isolated in an enclave around the capital city. Ridgway asked specifically that if he found the combat situation "to my liking" whether MacArthur would have any objection to "my attacking". MacArthur answered, "Eighth Army is yours, Matt. Do what you think best".

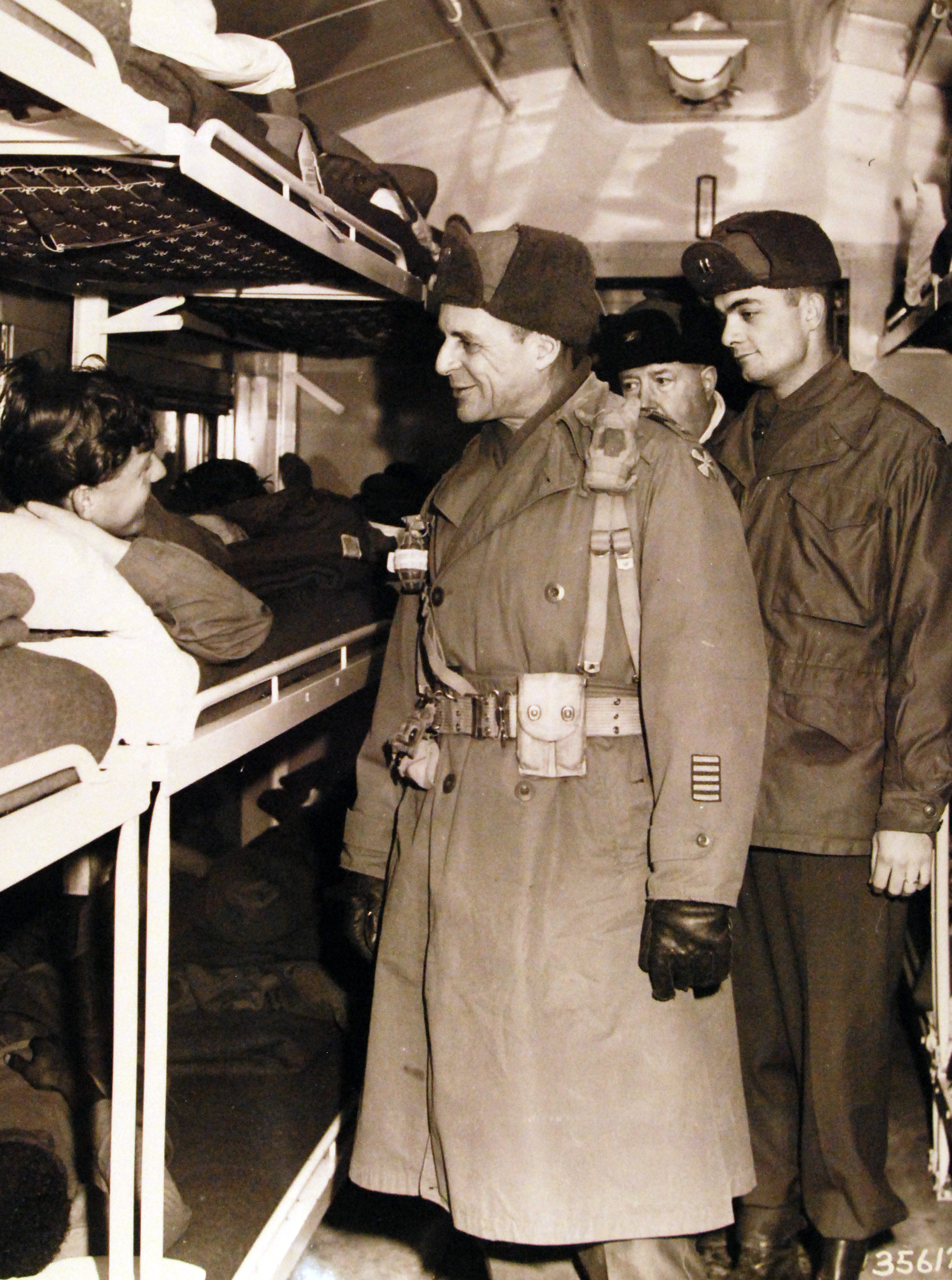
Ridgway visiting wounded UN soldiers onboard a hospital train, February 1951

Upon taking control of the battered Eighth Army, one of Ridgway's first acts was to restore soldiers' confidence in themselves. To accomplish this, he reorganized the command structure. During one of his first briefings in Korea at I Corps, Ridgway sat through an extensive discussion of various defensive plans and contingencies. At the end, he asked the staff about the status of their attack plans; the corps G-3 (operations officer) responded that he had no such plans. Within days, I Corps had a new G-3. He also replaced officers who did not send out patrols to fix enemy locations, and removed "enemy positions" from commanders' planning maps if local units had not been in recent contact to verify that the enemy was still there. Ridgway established a plan to rotate out those division commanders who had been in action for six months and replace them with fresh leaders. He sent out guidance to commanders at all levels that they were to spend more time at the front lines and less in their command posts in the rear. These steps had an immediate effect on morale.

With the intervention of China, the complexion of the Korean War had changed. Political leaders, in an attempt to prevent expansion of the war, did not allow UN forces to bomb the supply bases in China, nor the bridges across the Yalu River on the border between China and North Korea. The American army moved from an aggressive stance to fighting protective, delaying actions. Ridgway's second big tactical change was to make copious use of artillery.

China's casualties began to rise, and became very high as they pressed waves of attacks into the coordinated artillery fire. Under Ridgway's leadership, the Chinese offensive was slowed and finally brought to a halt at the battles of Chipyong-ni and Wonju. He then led his troops in Operation Thunderbolt, a counter-offensive in early 1951.

=== Supreme UN Commander ===
When MacArthur was relieved of command by President Harry S. Truman in April, Ridgway was promoted to full general, assuming command of all UN forces in Korea. As commanding general in Korea, Ridgway gained the nickname "Tin Tits" for his habit of wearing hand grenades attached to his load-bearing equipment at chest level. He oversaw the desegregation and integration of United States Army units in the Far East Command, which significantly influenced the wider army's subsequent desegregation. He also continued the bombing of North Korea, which destroyed much of the country's infrastructure and killed many civilians.

In 1951 Ridgway was elected an honorary member of the Virginia Society of the Cincinnati.

Ridgway also assumed from MacArthur the role of military governor of Japan, the Supreme Commander for the Allied Powers. During his tenure, Ridgway oversaw the restoration of Japan's independence and sovereignty on April 28, 1952. He was the second and last person to hold the title of SCAP before General Headquarters was abolished by General Order No. 10 on the day Japan's sovereignty was restored. He was relieved as commander of the Far East Command two weeks later.

== Cold War ==
=== Supreme Allied Commander, Europe ===
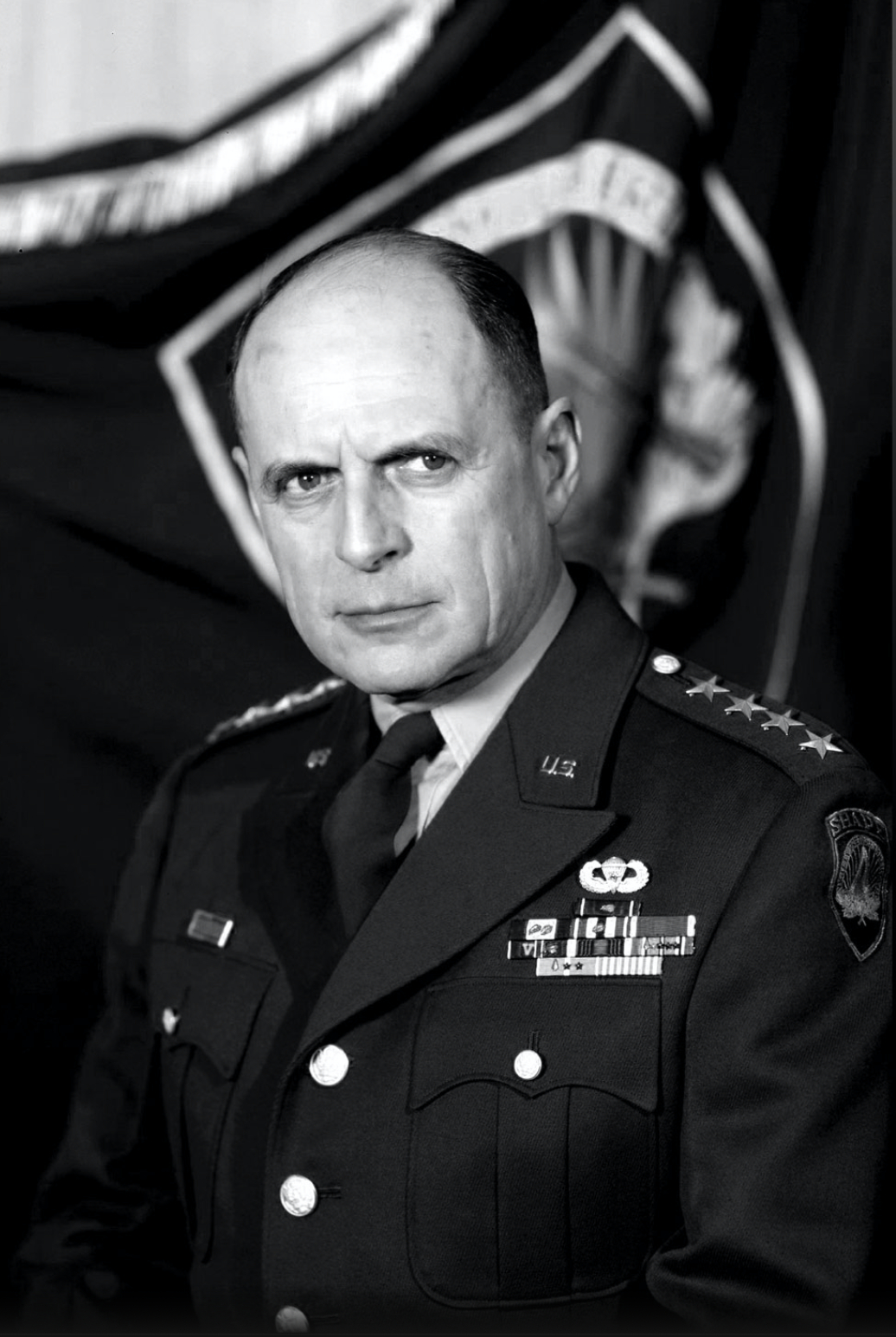
Ridgway during his tenure as Supreme Allied Commander Europe (SACEUR)

In May 1952, Ridgway succeeded General Dwight D. Eisenhower as the Supreme Allied Commander Europe (SACEUR) for the fledgling North Atlantic Treaty Organization (NATO). While in that position Ridgway made progress in developing a coordinated command structure, oversaw an expansion of forces and facilities, and improved training and standardization. He upset other European military leaders by surrounding himself with American staff. His tendency to tell the truth was not always politically wise. In a 1952 review, Bradley now Chairman of the Joint Chiefs of Staff, reported to Truman that "Ridgway had brought NATO to 'its realistic phase' and a 'generally encouraging picture of how the heterogeneous defense force is being gradually shaped.'"

Ridgway urged the Anglo-French-American high commissioners for Germany to pardon all German officers convicted of war crimes on the Eastern Front of World War II. He himself, he noted, had recently given orders in Korea "of the kind for which the German generals are sitting in prison". His "honor as a soldier" forced him to insist upon the release of these officers before he could "issue a single command to a German soldier of the European army".

=== Chief of Staff of the United States Army ===
On 17 August 1953, Ridgway succeeded General J. Lawton Collins as the Chief of Staff of the United States Army. After Eisenhower was elected president, he asked Ridgway for his assessment of United States military involvement in Vietnam in conjunction with the French. Ridgway prepared a comprehensive outline of the massive commitment that would be necessary for success, which dissuaded Eisenhower from intervening. A source of tension was Ridgway's belief that air power and nuclear bombs did not reduce the need for powerful, mobile ground forces to seize land and control populations. Ridgway was concerned that Eisenhower's proposal to significantly reduce the size of the army would leave it unable to counter the growing Soviet military threat, as noted by the 1954 Alfhem affair in Guatemala. These concerns would lead to recurring disagreements during his term as chief of staff.

==== Operation Vulture ====
Ridgway was a leader of the "Never Again Club" within the U.S. Army that regarded the Korean War which ended in a draw as something of a debacle and were strongly opposed to fighting another land war in Asia, especially against China. In the spring of 1954, Ridgway was opposed to Operation Vulture, the proposed American intervention in Vietnam with tactical nuclear weapons to rescue the French from certain defeat at the Battle of Dien Bien Phu. The chairman of the Joint Chiefs of Staff, Admiral Arthur W. Radford, supported Operation Vulture and recommended it to Eisenhower, arguing that the United States could not permit the victory of the Communist Viet Minh over the French. Making matters more complicated on 20 March 1954, the chief of the French general staff, General Paul Ély, visited Washington and Radford had shown him the plans for Vulture and gave him the impression that the United States was committed to carrying it out.

In a dissenting report, Ridgway argued that the plan would not work: he maintained that airpower alone, even with the use of tactical nuclear weapons, would not be enough to save the French. Ridgway argued that only the commitment of seven American infantry divisions could save the French at Dien Bien Phu, and predicted that if the United States intervened in Vietnam, then so too would China. Ridgway wrote that if China entered the Indochina War, then the United States would have to commit 12 divisions to Vietnam. Additional requirements would include fifty-five engineering battalions, between 500,000 and 1,000,000 men. The United States would have to demand greater mobilization than in Korea, draft calls of 100,000 a month. Against Radford, Ridgway argued having the United States bogged down in a land war in Asia once again fighting the Chinese would be a costly distraction from Europe, a place that he maintained was far more important than Vietnam. Ridgway stated "Indochina is devoid of decisive military objectives" and to fight a war there "would be a serious diversion of limited U.S. capabilities". Ridgway felt that Radford as an admiral who had never fought against the Chinese was too dismissive of Chinese power, and he did not see the dangers of the United States fighting yet another trying struggle against the Chinese, in less than a year after the end of the Korean war.

Ridgway's objections to Vulture gave Eisenhower pause, but Radford's vehement insistence on nuclear weapon deployment – that three tactical atomic bombs dropped on the Viet Minh forces besieging the French at Dien Bien Phu would be enough to save Indochina for France – made the president indecisive. Both the Vice President, Richard Nixon, and the Secretary of State, John Foster Dulles, were all for Vulture and lobbied Eisenhower hard to accept it. Eisenhower himself felt guilty over the atomic bombings of Hiroshima and Nagasaki in 1945, and during one meeting told Radford and Air Force General Nathan F. Twining: "You boys must be crazy. We can't use those awful things against Asians for a second time in less than ten years. My God!" Eisenhower finally agreed to carry out Vulture, but only if Congress gave its approval first and if Great Britain agreed to join in. The leaders of Congress gave an equivocal answer, rejecting the idea of Vulture as an American operation, but willing to support it if it was an Anglo-American operation. Finally, the British Prime Minister Winston Churchill rejected the idea of British intervention in Vietnam, which killed Vulture.

On 7 May 1954, what was left of the French forces at Dien Bien Phu surrendered, which brought down the government of Premier Joseph Laniel in Paris, and led to a new government being formed by Pierre Mendès France whose sole mandate was to pull all French forces out of Indochina.

==== Retirement ====
Eisenhower approved a waiver to the military's policy of mandatory retirement at age 60 so Ridgway could complete his two-year term as Chief of Staff. Disagreements with the administration over its downgrading of the army in favor of the United States Navy and the United States Air Force, prevented Ridgway from being appointed to a second term. Ridgway retired from the army on 30 June 1955, and was succeeded by his one-time 82nd Airborne Division chief of staff, General Maxwell D. Taylor. Even after he retired, Ridgway was a constant critic of Eisenhower. During the second debate of 1960 presidential debate on 7 October, John F. Kennedy mentioned Ridgway as among supporters of the position that the United States should not attempt to defend Quemoy (Kinmen) and Matsu from an attack by China (PRC).

=== The "Wise Men" ===
In November 1967, Ridgway was recruited to join the "Wise Men", a group of retired diplomats, politicians and generals who assembled from time to time to give their advice on the Vietnam War to President Lyndon B. Johnson. Though the "Wise Men" group whose informal leader was the former Secretary of State Dean Acheson were widely dismissed as a gimmick to allow Johnson photo-opps, Johnson had much respect for the "Wise Men" and took their counsel seriously. In early 1968, Ridgway together with General Gavin and General David M. Shoup expressed their opposition to the strategic bombing offensive against North Vietnam and declared that South Vietnam was not worth the trouble it was taking to defend it. The criticism sufficiently rattled Johnson's powerful National Security Adviser Walt Rostow that he wrote a 5-page memorandum for the president arguing that Ridgway, Gavin and Shoup did not know what they were talking about and expressed supreme confidence that the bombing offensive would soon force North Vietnam to its knees.

In the aftermath of the Tet Offensive together with Johnson's near-defeat in the New Hampshire Democratic primary, where Johnson defeated the anti-war Senator Eugene McCarthy by only 300 votes, the White House was gripped by crisis with Johnson torn between continuing to seek a military solution to the Vietnam war or turning towards a diplomatic solution. Adding to the sense of crisis was a maneuver by the Chairman of the Joint Chiefs of Staff, General Earle Wheeler, to force Johnson to rule out the diplomatic solution and to continue with the military solution. On 23 February 1968 Wheeler told General William Westmoreland to advise Johnson to send another 206,000 troops to Vietnam, even through Westmoreland insisted that he did not need the extra troops. Under Wheeler's prodding, Westmoreland did make the request for another 206,000 soldiers, insisting in his report to Johnson that he could not win the war without them. Wheeler's real purpose in having Westmoreland make the troop request was to force Johnson to mobilize the reserves and the National Guard. By 1968, there was no way to send another 206,000 men to join the half-million Americans already in South Vietnam without abandoning the American commitments in Europe, South Korea and elsewhere except by mobilizing the reserves and the National Guard. Calling out the reserves and National Guard would disrupt the economy, which in turn would force Johnson to end the peacetime economy, and taking such a step would make it politically impossible to turn towards a diplomatic solution. The economic sacrifices that a wartime economy would entail could only be justified to the American people by saying the goal was to fight on until victory.

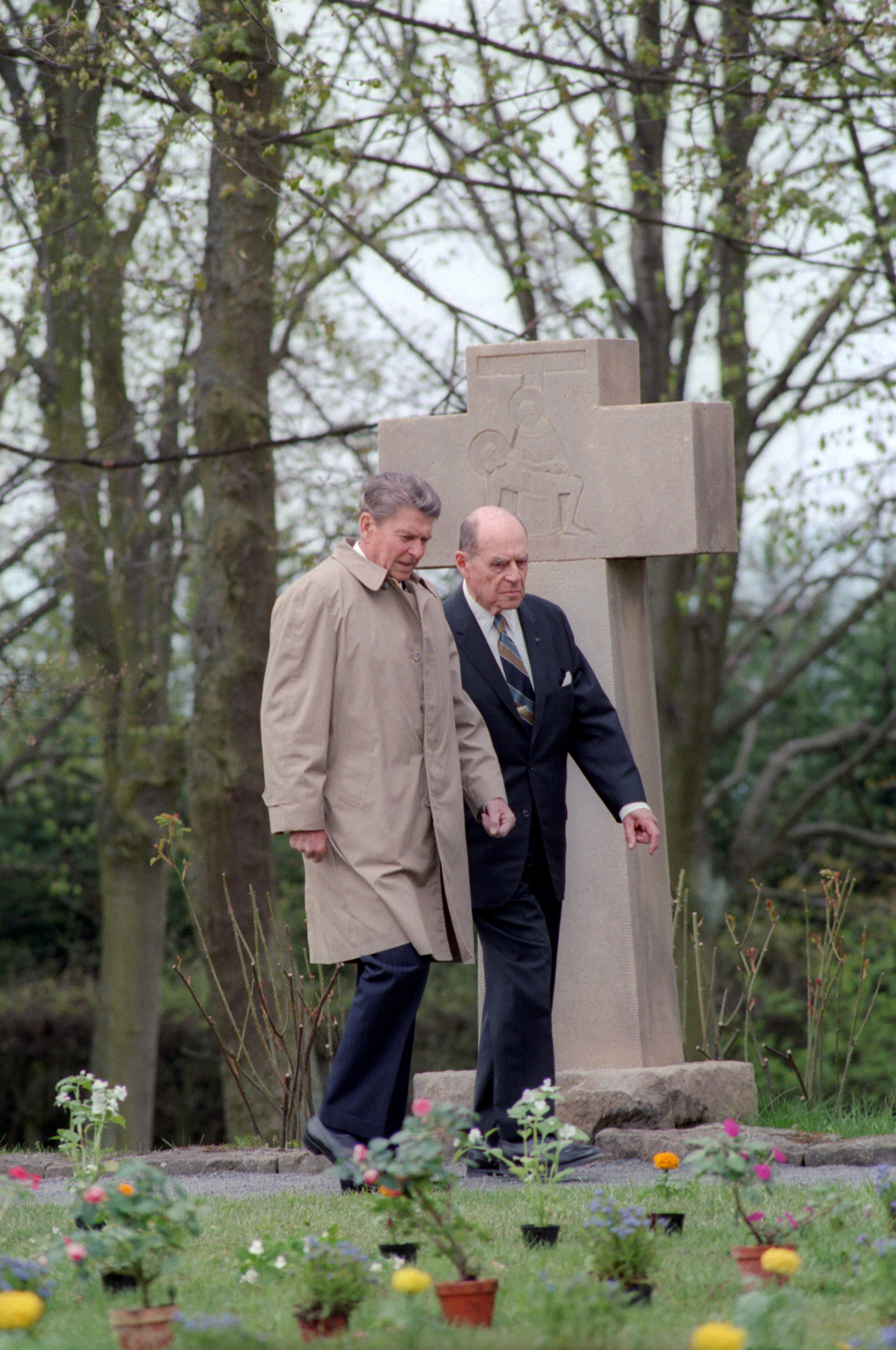
Ridgway with US President Ronald Reagan at Bitburg Cemetery in West Germany, 5 May 1985

At the same time as the debate swirled over Westmoreland's troop request, Clark Clifford, a longstanding friend of Johnson's and a known hawk arrived at the Pentagon on 1 March 1968 as the newly appointed Defense Secretary. Clifford's friend, Senator J. William Fulbright arranged for him to meet privately with Ridgway together with General Gavin. Both Ridgway and Gavin advised Clifford that victory in Vietnam was unobtainable and he should use his influence with Johnson to persuade him to seek a diplomatic solution. The advice from Ridgway and Gavin helped to convert Clifford from being a hawk to a dove.

Clifford realized the political implications of the request for 206,000 more troops and lobbied Johnson hard to reject it, urging him to seek a diplomatic solution instead while Rostow advised him to accept it. Since Westmoreland had maintained in his report that victory in Vietnam was impossible without the additional 206,000 troops, to reject the troop request would mean abandoning seeking a military solution. To resolve the debate, Johnson called a meeting of the "Wise Men" on 25 March 1968 to advise him what to do. The next day, the majority of the "Wise Men" advised Johnson that victory in Vietnam was impossible and that he should seek a diplomatic solution, counsel that was decisive in persuading him to open peace talks. Of the 14 "Wise Men", only Taylor, Robert Murphy, Abe Fortas and Bradley advised Johnson to continue seeking a military solution with the rest all speaking for a diplomatic solution. Ridgway's status as a war hero whom no-one could accuse of being "soft on Communism" added to the prestige of the "Wise Men" and made Johnson more likely to accept their advice. On 31 March 1968, Johnson went on national television to announce his willingness to open peace talks with North Vietnam, that he was unconditionally stopping bombing most of North Vietnam and finally declaring that he was withdrawing from the 1968 election.

== Personal life ==
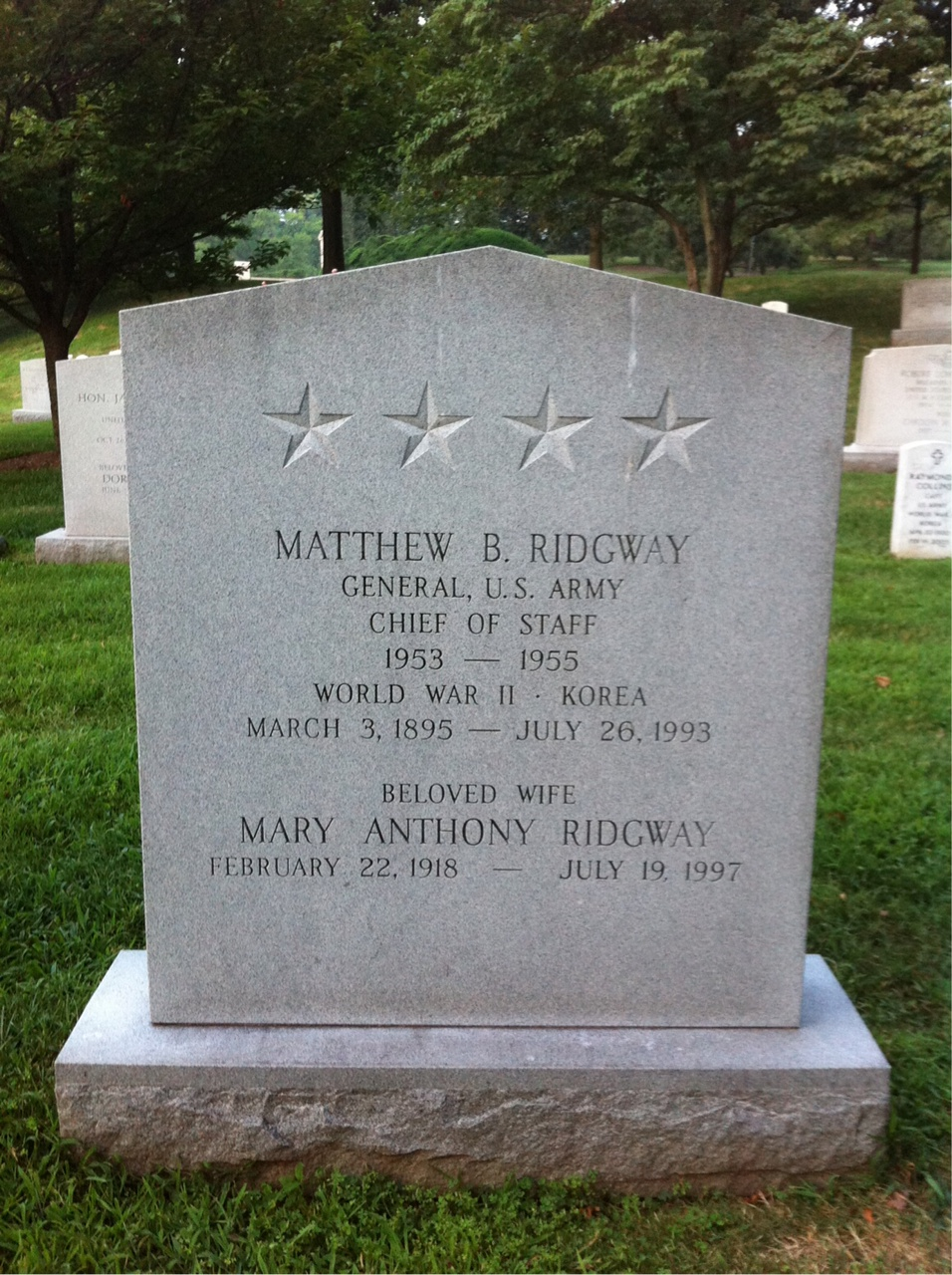
Ridgway's grave at Arlington National Cemetery

In 1917 he married Julia Caroline Blount (1895–1986). They had two daughters, Constance and Shirley, before divorcing in 1930.

Shortly after his divorce, Ridgway married Margaret ("Peggy") Wilson Dabney (1891–1968), the widow of a West Point graduate (Henry Harold Dabney, class of 1915), and in 1936 he adopted Peggy's daughter Virginia Ann Dabney (1919–2004). Ridgway and Peggy divorced in June 1947. Later that year he married Mary Princess Anthony Long (1918–1997), who was nicknamed "Penny". They remained married until his death. They were the parents of a son, Matthew, Jr., who died in a 1971 accident shortly after graduating from Bucknell University and receiving his commission as a second lieutenant through the Reserve Officers' Training Corps.

Ridgway remained active in retirement, both in leadership capacities and as a speaker and author. He relocated to the Pittsburgh suburb of Fox Chapel, Pennsylvania, in 1955 after accepting the chairmanship of the board of trustees of the Mellon Institute as well as a position on the board of directors of Gulf Oil Corporation, among others. The year after his retirement, he published his autobiography, Soldier: The Memoirs of Matthew B. Ridgway. In 1967, he wrote The Korean War.

In 1960, Ridgway retired from his position at the Mellon Institute but continued to serve on multiple corporate boards of directors, Pittsburgh civic groups and Pentagon strategic study committees.

Ridgway continued to advocate for a strong military to be used judiciously. He gave many speeches, wrote, and participated in various panels, discussions, and groups. In early 1968, he was invited to a White House luncheon to discuss Indochina. After the luncheon, Ridgway met privately for two hours with President Johnson and Vice President Hubert Humphrey. When asked his opinion, Ridgway advised against deeper involvement in Vietnam and against using force to resolve the Pueblo Incident. In an article in Foreign Affairs, Ridgway stated that political goals should be based on vital national interests and that military goals should be consistent with and support the political goals, but that neither situation was true in the Vietnam War.

Ridgway advocated maintaining a chemical, biological, and radiological weapons capability, arguing that they could accomplish national goals better than the weapons currently in use. In 1976, Ridgway was a founding board member of the Committee on the Present Danger, which urged greater military preparedness to counter a perceived increasing Soviet threat.

On 5 May 1985, Ridgway was a participant in US President Ronald Reagan's visit to Kolmeshöhe Cemetery near Bitburg, when former Luftwaffe ace fighter pilot Johannes Steinhoff (1913–1994) in an unscheduled act firmly shook his hand in an act of reconciliation between the former foes.

== Death ==
Ridgway died at his suburban Pittsburgh home on 26 July 1993, of cardiac arrest, at the age of 98. He was buried at Arlington National Cemetery, in Arlington, Virginia. In a graveside eulogy, Chairman of the Joint Chiefs of Staff, General Colin Powell, said: "No soldier ever performed his duty better than this man. No soldier ever upheld his honor better than this man. No soldier ever loved his country more than this man did. Every American soldier owes a debt to this great man".

== Legacy ==
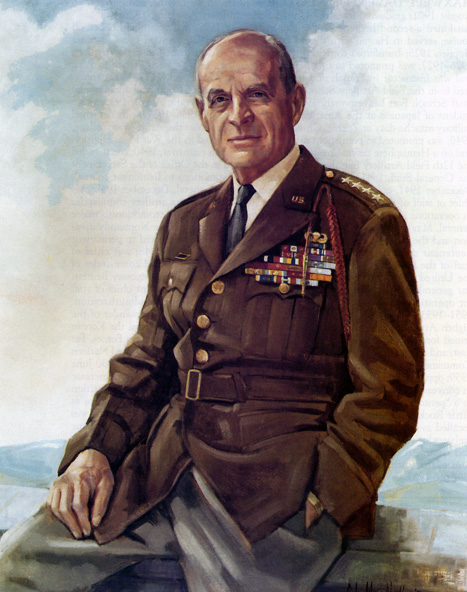
Portrait by Clarence Lamont MacNelly

During his career, Ridgway was recognized as an outstanding leader, earning the respect of subordinates, peers, and superiors. General Omar Bradley described Ridgway's work turning the tide of the Korean War as "the greatest feat of personal leadership in the history of the Army". A soldier in Normandy remarked about an intense battle while trying to cross a key bridge, "The most memorable sight that day was Ridgway, Gavin, and Maloney standing right there where it was the hottest [heaviest incoming fire]. The point is that every soldier who hit that causeway saw every general officer and the regimental and battalion commanders right there. It was a truly inspirational effort".

On the day of the Germans' furthest advance in the Battle of the Bulge, Ridgway commented to his subordinate officers in the XVIII Airborne Corps: "The situation is normal and completely satisfactory. The enemy has thrown in all his mobile reserves, and this is his last major offensive effort in this war. This Corps will halt that effort; then attack and smash him".

Ridgway considered leadership to have three primary ingredients: character, courage, and competence. He described character—including self-discipline, loyalty, selflessness, modesty, and willingness to accept responsibility and admit mistakes—as the "bedrock on which the whole edifice of leadership rests". His concept of courage included both physical and moral courage. Competence included physical fitness, anticipating when crises will occur and being present to resolve them, and being close to subordinates—communicating clearly and ensuring that they are treated and led well and fairly.

== Major assignments ==
- Staff Officer, War Plans Division – 24 December 1941 to 19 February 1942
- Assistant Division Commander, 82nd Infantry Division – 19 February 1942 to 26 June 1942
- Commander, 82nd Airborne Division – 26 June 1942 to 27 August 1944
- Commander, XVIII Airborne Corps – 27 August 1944 to October 1945
- Deputy Supreme Allied Commander, Mediterranean – October 1945 to 1946
- US Army Representative to the Military Staff Committee of the United Nations – 1946 to June 1948
- Commander, United States Caribbean Command – June 1948 to October 1949
- Deputy Chief of Staff for Administration – November 1949 to 24 December 1950
- Commander, Eighth United States Army – 26 December 1950 to 11 April 1951
- Commander, United Nations Command – 11 April 1951 to 12 May 1952
- Supreme Commander for the Allied Powers (SCAP) – 11 April 1951 to 28 April 1952
- Commander in Chief, United States Far East Command – 11 April 1951 to 12 May 1952
- Supreme Allied Commander Europe for NATO – 30 May 1952 to 11 July 1953
- Commander, United States Army European Command (EUCOM) – 30 May 1952 to 1 August 1952
- Commander in Chief, United States European Command (CINCEUR) – 1 August 1952 to 11 July 1953
- Chief of Staff of the United States Army – 17 August 1953 to 30 June 1955

== Orders, decorations, medals and badges ==
=== United States badges, decorations and medals ===
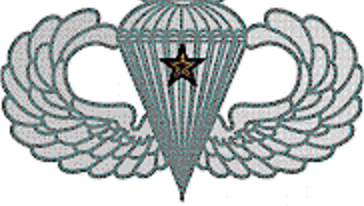
Combat Infantryman Badge (Ridgway is one of five general officers who have been awarded the honorary CIB for service while a general officer, along with General Joseph Stilwell, Major General William F. Dean, General of the Army Omar Bradley, and General of the Army Douglas MacArthur. Generals are not allowed to be awarded the CIB. The CIB is only available to colonels and below.)
Combat Parachutist Badge with one bronze jump star
Army Staff Identification Badge
French Fourragère in the colors of WWII
Six Overseas Service Bars

Army Distinguished Service Cross with oak leaf cluster
Army Distinguished Service Medal with four oak leaf clusters
Silver Star with two oak leaf clusters
Legion of Merit with oak leaf cluster
Bronze Star with "V" device and oak leaf cluster
Purple Heart
Army Presidential Unit Citation
Presidential Medal of Freedom
World War I Victory Medal
Second Nicaraguan Campaign Medal
American Defense Service Medal with one bronze service star
American Campaign Medal
European–African–Middle Eastern Campaign Medal with Arrowhead device and eight campaign stars
Asiatic–Pacific Campaign Medal
World War II Victory Medal
Army of Occupation Medal with "Germany" clasp
National Defense Service Medal
Korean Service Medal with seven campaign stars

=== International and foreign orders, decorations and medals ===
Grand Cross of the Legion of Honor of France (1953)
Order of the Crown (Belgium), Grand Cross
Order of Saints Maurice and Lazarus, Knight Grand Cross (Italy)
Order of George I, Grand Cross (Greece)
Order of the Oak Crown, Grand Cross (Luxembourg)
Order of the Aztec Eagle, Grand Cross (Mexico)
Order of Orange-Nassau, Knight Grand Cross (The Netherlands)
Military Order of Aviz, Grand Cross (Portugal)
Order of Saint-Charles, Grand Officer (Monaco)
Order of Merit of the Italian Republic, Knight Grand Cross
Order of the White Elephant, 1st Class (Thailand)
Order of the Bath, Knight Commander (Great Britain)
Order of the Red Banner (Union of Soviet Socialist Republics)
Order of Boyacá, Grand Officer (Colombia)
Military Order of Savoy, Grand Officer (Italy)
Philippine Legion of Honor, Chief Commander
Order of Vasco Núñez de Balboa, Grand Officer (Panama)
Order of Leopold II, Commander with palm (Belgium)
Order of the Southern Cross, Officer (Brazil)
Croix de Guerre (France) with bronze palm
Croix de guerre (Belgium), WWII with bronze palm
United Nations Korea Medal
Inter-American Defense Board Medal
Korean War Service Medal

=== Other honors ===
- Congressional Gold Medal
- The National Infantry Association has awarded him their annual Doughboy Award.
- The Freedom House Annual Freedom Award, ‘https://freedomhouse.org/freedom-award’
- Ridgway appeared on the April 30, 1951, and May 12, 1952, covers of Life magazine.
- Ridgway appeared on the March 5, 1951, and July 16, 1951, covers of Time magazine.

== Dates of rank ==
Insignia	Rank	Component	Date
No insignia	Cadet	United States Military Academy	14 June 1913
	Second lieutenant	Regular Army	20 April 1917
	First lieutenant	Regular Army	15 May 1917
	Captain	National Army	5 August 1917
	Captain	Regular Army	18 July 1919
	Major	Regular Army	1 October 1932
	Lieutenant colonel	Regular Army	1 July 1940
	Colonel	Army of the United States	11 December 1941
	Brigadier general	Army of the United States	15 January 1942
	Major general	Army of the United States	6 April 1942
	Lieutenant general	Army of the United States	4 June 1945
	Brigadier general	Regular Army	1 November 1945
	Major general	Regular Army	Retroactive to 6 April 1942
	General	Army of the United States	11 May 1951
	General	Regular Army, Retired	30 June 1955

== Namesakes ==
- Ridgway was honored by his adopted hometown of Pittsburgh with the entrance to the Soldiers and Sailors National Military Museum and Memorial, located in the city's education and cultural district, being renamed "Ridgway Court".
- Bearing his name is the Matthew B. Ridgway Center for International Security Studies at the University of Pittsburgh.
- Ridgway is the namesake of the mascot for the Houston Astros' Single-A baseball team, the Fayetteville Woodpeckers.
- The reading room at the U.S. Army Heritage and Education Center special collections is called Ridgway Hall.

Military offices
Preceded by Omar Bradley	Commanding General 82nd Infantry Division; June–August 1942	Post redesignated 82nd Airborne Division
New title	Commanding General 82nd Airborne Division; August 1942 – August 1944	Succeeded by James Gavin
New title	Commanding General XVIIIth Airborne Corps; August 1944 – July 1945	Succeeded by John W. Leonard
Preceded by Walton Walker	Commanding General Eighth United States Army; December 1950 – April 1951	Succeeded by James Van Fleet
Preceded by Douglas MacArthur	Commander United Nations Command in Korea; April 1951 – May 1952	Succeeded by Mark Clark
Preceded by Douglas MacArthur	Supreme Commander Allied Powers Japan; April 1951 – April 1952	Position terminated
Preceded by Dwight Eisenhower	Supreme Allied Commander Europe; June 1952 – August 1953	Succeeded by Alfred Gruenther
Preceded by Joseph Collins	Chief of Staff of the United States Army; August 1953 – June 1955	Succeeded by Maxwell Taylor
