= Robert T. Frederick =

United States Army general (1907–1970)

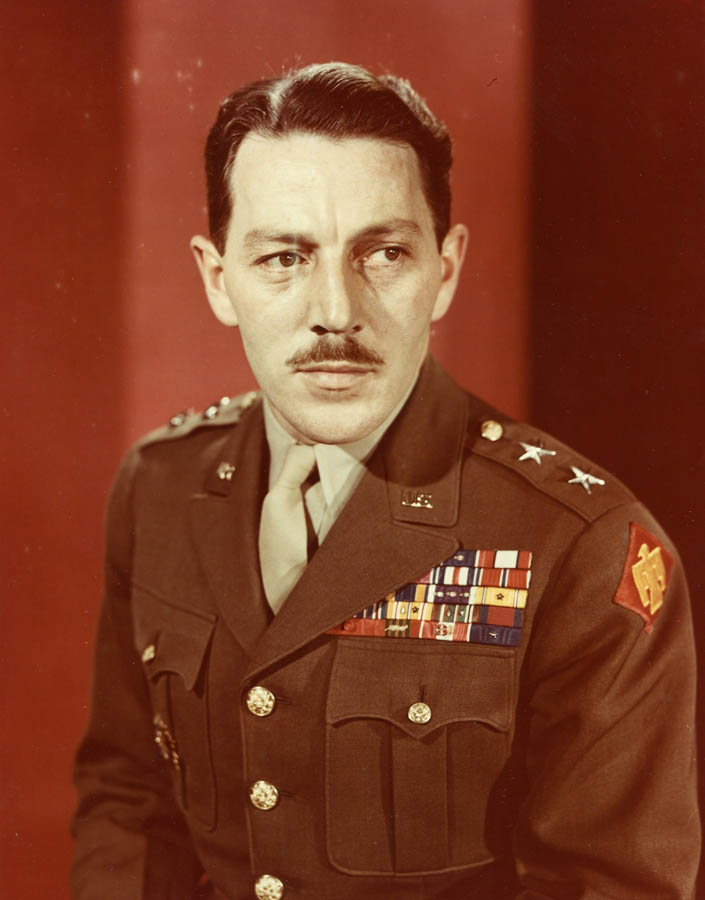
- Born: March 14, 1907; San Francisco, California, U.S.
- Died: November 29, 1970 (aged 63); Stanford, California, U.S.
- Military career
- Allegiance: United States
- Branch: United States Army
- Service years: 1928–1952
- Rank: Major General
- Service number: O-17196
- Unit: Coastal Artillery Corps
- Commands: 1st Special Service Force; 1st Allied Airborne Task Force; 45th Infantry Division; 4th Infantry Division; 6th Infantry Division
- Conflicts: World War II Aleutian Islands Campaign - July 1943; Italian Campaign; Battle of Monte La Difensa - December 1943; Battle of Monte Majo - January 1944; Battle of Anzio - 2 February 1944; Liberation of Rome - 4 June 1944; Invasion of Southern France; Operation Dragoon - 15th August 1944; Liberation of Cannes - 24th August 1944; Operation Northwind - December 31st, 1944– January 25th, 1945; Operation Undertone - March 8–24, 1945; Battle of Aschaffenburg - March 28 - April 3, 1945 Battle of Nuremberg (1945) - 16–20 April 1945
- Awards: Distinguished Service Cross (2); Army Distinguished Service Medal (2); Silver Star; Legion of Merit (2); Bronze Star Medal (2); Purple Heart (8)

Major General Robert Tryon Frederick (March 14, 1907 – November 29, 1970) was a senior United States Army officer. During World War II, he commanded the 1st Special Service Force nicknamed the "Devil's Brigade", and the 1st Allied Airborne Task Force, an ad hoc division-sized airborne formation, commanding the task force as a Brigadier General during Operation Dragoon. As a Major general at 37 years old from December 3, 1944, until September 1945 he commanded the 45th Infantry Division during the Western Allied invasion of Germany and the Allied-occupied Germany that followed. He was twice awarded the Distinguished Service Cross (United States) and was a recipient of a remarkable eight Purple Hearts received from combat during World War II.

== Early life and military career ==
Frederick as a United States Military Academy cadet c. 1928

Frederick was born on March 14, 1907, in San Francisco, California. He attended Staunton Military Academy from 1923 to 1924 and the United States Military Academy (USMA) at West Point from 1924 to 1928. Upon graduation from West Point, New York, he was commissioned as a second lieutenant in the Coast Artillery Corps of the United States Army. He graduated from the U.S. Army Command and General Staff College at Fort Leavenworth, Kansas in 1939.

== World War II ==
Frederick was serving as a staff officer in the War Department when the United States entered World War II following the Japanese attack on Pearl Harbor. In 1942 Frederick, then a lieutenant colonel, was tasked with raising a new U.S.-Canadian regiment size commando force, which became the 1st Special Service Force (later called the "Devil's Brigade"). The unit, activated on July 9, 1942, at Fort William Henry Harrison, Montana, was originally intended for commando operations in Norway, and trained extensively in winter and mountain warfare, as well as hand-to-hand combat and other infantry skills. In April 1943, the unit moved to Camp Bradford, Virginia for training, then to Fort Ethan Allen, Vermont. The Norway mission was cancelled, however, and the 1st Special Service Force was sent instead to the Aleutian Islands in July 1943. It returned to the contiguous United States in September, and then left in October for the European Theater of Operations (ETO).

Frederick's men arrived in Casablanca in French Morocco in November 1943 and quickly moved to the Italian front. Landing at Naples on November 19, 1943, the 1st Special Service Force went into the line. In December 1943 and January 1944, the 1st Special Service Force conducted a series of operations at Monte la Difensa, Monte la Remetanea, Monte Sammucro (Hill 720), Monte Vischiataro and Monte Majo. The 1st Special Service Force attacked and captured the enemy forces at the impregnable Monte la Difensa and at Monte Majo. Frederick was wounded three times at Monte Majo and was awarded the Distinguished Service Cross for his actions and leadership in the battle from 10–13 January 1944. He was promoted to Brigadier General following Monte Majo.

On February 2, 1944, Frederick and his men landed at Anzio and went into action along the Mussolini Canal. They were the first Allied troops to enter the Italian capital of Rome on June 4, 1944. Frederick was decorated twice with the Distinguished Service Cross, the U.S. Army's second highest award for valor in combat. The first award was for Monte Majo, and the second award for actions on June 4, 1944, during the drive on Rome. While at Anzio he was wounded a number of times, including two separate wounds on a single day.

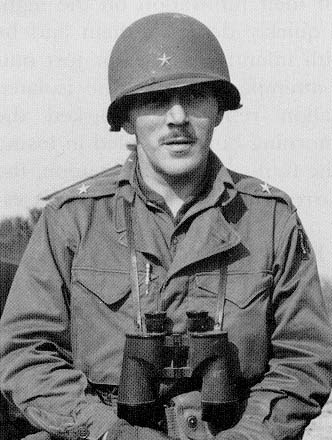
Frederick, pictured here as a brigadier general, while commanding the 1st Special Service Force

On June 23, 1944, Frederick announced he was leaving the unit. He was promoted to the one-star general officer rank of brigadier general effective 18 January, and was given command of the 1st Allied Airborne Task Force, an ad hoc division-sized airborne formation, for the Allied invasion of Southern France. The task force consisted of the British 2nd Independent Parachute Brigade and the American 509th and 551st Parachute Infantry Battalions, the 517th Parachute Regimental Combat Team, the 550th Glider Infantry Battalion, and the 460th and 463rd Parachute Field Artillery Battalions, along with various support units.

On August 15, under the code name Rugby Force, the unit jumped into the Argens Valley between Le Luc and Le Muy, behind the Massif des Maures, a key piece of terrain which overlooked the Allied landing beaches near St. Tropez and St. Raphaël. Having successfully blocked German forces from reaching the invasion beaches, the 1st Airborne Task Force linked up with the U.S. 36th Infantry Division on August 17, 1944. It then moved up the French Riviera coastline, taking Cannes unopposed on August 24, 1944, and linking up with Frederick's old unit, the 1st Special Service Force. The 1st Special Service Force had initially been tasked to seize several small islands off the French Riviera and then moved onshore, where it was attached to the 1st Airborne Task Force on August 22 (replacing the British 2nd Independent Parachute Brigade). The task force then fought on to the French-Italian border, where it took up defensive positions. The task force was dissolved on November 23, 1944 (and the 1st Special Service Force was disbanded on December 5).

Frederick was, at the age of just 37, promoted to the two-star rank of major general and given command of the 45th Infantry Division on December 3, 1944. Along with Major General James M. Gavin, then commanding the 82nd Airborne Division, this made both Frederick and Gavin (eight days older than Frederick) the two youngest division commanders in the U.S. Army during the war. He led the 45th Division until September 10, 1945. The 45th saw heavy combat in French Alsace from December 1944 through to February 1945, and was pulled from the line to rehabilitate on February 17. In mid-March, it was assigned to XV Corps for Operation Undertone, the final drive into Germany.

The division crossed the Rhine and advanced to the Main. Moving along the Main into Bavaria, participating in heavy fighting in Aschaffenburg from March 28 to April 3 and then drove to Nuremberg, taken in heavy fighting from April 16–20. Moving south, the division crossed the Danube on April 26, and opened up the path for the U.S. 20th Armored Division to drive on Munich. Reaching Munich on April 29, the division shifted from combat to occupation.

The British Prime Minister, Sir Winston Churchill, when advised by General Dwight Eisenhower that the 1st Special Service Force had taken Monte la Difensa, declared that Frederick was "the greatest fighting general of all time" and "if we had had a dozen more like him we would have smashed Hitler in 1942".

== Post-World War II ==
After a period of occupation duty, the 45th Infantry Division prepared to return to the United States and Frederick relinquished command in September 1945. From 1 November 1945 to 19 August 1947 he was commandant of the Coast Artillery School, and presided over its move from Fort Monroe to Fort Winfield Scott. After a period of staff duty and recuperation (he had been wounded eight times), Major General Frederick was assigned to Allied occupation forces in Austria, commanding the U.S. Sector, of the Vienna Inter-Allied Command in 1948. From February 28, 1949, to October 10, 1950, he commanded the 4th Infantry Division, which had been reactivated as a training division at Fort Ord, California, in 1947. In October 1950, the division was redesignated the 6th Infantry Division, and Frederick continued as its commanding general until 1951.

In 1951, Frederick returned to Europe to take command of the Joint U.S. Military Aid Group, Greece (JUSMAG Greece). He retired on disability in March 1952. In the 1968 film The Devil's Brigade, which chronicled the formation, training and combat in Italy of the 1st Special Service Force, Robert T. Frederick was played by actor William Holden. Frederick died on November 29, 1970, in Stanford, California.

== V-42 combat knife ==
The V-42 combat knife was designed in part by Frederick when commanding officer of the 1st Special Service Force. The V-42 was the trademark weapon of the 1st Special Service Force, and its members were trained extensively in its use. It is a short-bladed stiletto with a thumb groove on the top of the blade to promote proper hand placement when attacking an opponent. It is often confused with the longer- and thicker-bladed Fairbairn–Sykes fighting knife. The profile of the V-42 knife appears in the crests of the U.S. Army Special Forces and Canada's Joint Task Force Two.

== Military awards ==
Frederick's military decorations and awards include:

1st Row	Distinguished Service Cross w/ Oak Leaf Cluster		Army Distinguished Service Medal w/ Oak Leaf Cluster	Silver Star
2nd Row	Legion of Merit w/ Oak Leaf Cluster	Bronze Star Medal w/ Oak Leaf Cluster	Air Medal	Purple Heart w/ seven Oak Leaf Clusters
3rd Row	American Defense Service Medal w/ battle clasp (service star)	American Campaign Medal	Asiatic-Pacific Campaign Medal w/ one service star and Arrowhead device	European-African-Middle Eastern Campaign Medal w/ three service stars
4th Row	World War II Victory Medal	Army of Occupation Medal	National Defense Service Medal	Distinguished Service Order (United Kingdom)
5th Row	Officer of the Legion of Honour (France)	Croix de guerre 1939–1945 w/ palm (France)	Grand Officer of the Order of St. Charles (Monaco)	King Haakon VII Freedom Medal (Norway)

=== Distinguished Service Cross Citation (1st Award) ===
Rank: Brigadier General (then colonel)
Unit: 1st Special Service Force
Awarded on: 1944
Action: January 10 to 13, 1944
General Orders: Headquarters, Fifth U.S. Army, General Orders No. 102 (1944)

The President of the United States of America takes pleasure in presenting the Distinguished Service Cross to Brigadier General Robert Tryon Frederick (ASN: 0-17196), United States Army

Citation:

For extraordinary heroism in connection with military operations against an armed enemy as Commander of the 1st Special Service Force, in action against enemy forces during the period 10 January to 13 January 1944, near Mount Vischiataro, Italy. While commanding his own organization and an attached task force, Brigadier General Frederick made a personal reconnaissance to determine hostile positions prior to an attack. Far in advance of the foremost elements of his command, under enemy machine gun, mortar and artillery fire, he probed enemy defenses and selected a covered route of approach for his troops. While leading his men against the enemy, he continued his reconnaissance in advance of his forward troops to obtain information from which to plan the development of the attack. Operating in terrain almost devoid of cover and concealment, he organized a surprise attack that quickly drove the enemy from a strategically important position. Brigadier General Frederick's constant presence under enemy fire forward of his own troops proved an inspiration to them and a decisive factor in the accomplishment of his mission. His heroism, aggressiveness, and tactical skill exemplify the highest traditions of the military forces of the United States and reflect great credit upon himself, his unit, and the United States Army.

=== Distinguished Service Cross Citation (2nd Award) ===
Rank: Major General (then Brig. General)
Unit: 1st Special Service Force
Awarded on: 1944
Action: June 4, 1944
General Orders: Headquarters, Fifth U.S. Army, General Orders No. 102 (1944)

The President of the United States of America takes pleasure in presenting a Bronze Oak Leaf Cluster in lieu of a Second Award of the Distinguished Service Cross to Major General Robert Tryon Frederick (ASN: 0-17196), United States Army

Citation:

For extraordinary heroism in connection with military operations against an armed enemy as Commander of the 1st Special Service Force, in action against enemy forces on 4 June 1944, in Rome, Italy. In order to advance to the city of Rome and seize bridges within the city, General Frederick organized a small, fast-moving force of armored vehicles and infantry to speedily execute the mission. Upon entering the city, the force met strong, determined resistance. Because of communication difficulties, General Frederick moved from place to place, constantly under fire, issuing orders and controlling his units. When the resistance had been overcome and movement through the city resumed, General Frederick, with only a small party, sped ahead in his half-track vehicle to examine the bridges for demolitions and neutralize charges that may have been placed but not yet exploded. As the examination of the first bridge was completed, an enemy unit approached to cross. In the ensuing fight, five of the enemy were killed, six wounded, eleven captured, and the remainder forced to withdraw. Although General Frederick had been slightly wounded early in the day and twice wounded at the bridge, he spent the remainder of the night disposing his forces to protect the bridges. His courage, leadership and determination in battle inspired his troops and were largely responsible for the successful accomplishment of a difficult operation. Major General Frederick's gallant leadership, personal bravery and zealous devotion to duty exemplify the highest traditions of the military forces of the United States and reflect great credit upon himself, his unit, and the United States Army.

== Bibliography ==
- Adleman, Robert H.; Colonel George Walton (1966). The Devil's Brigade. Philadelphia, PA: Chilton Books.
- Burhans, Robert D., The First Special Service Force: A Canadian/American Wartime Alliance: The Devil's Brigade (Washington: Infantry Journal Press Inc. 1947)
- Cottingham, Peter Layton Once Upon a Wartime: A Canadian Who Survived the Devil's Brigade (P.L. Cottingham, Manitoba Canada, 1996)
- Joyce, Kenneth H. (2006). Snow Plough and the Jupiter Deception – The Story of the 1st Special Service Force and the 1st Canadian Special Service Battalion – 1942–1945. St. Catharines, ON: Vanwell Publishing. ISBN 9781551250946.
- Nadler, John (2005). A Perfect Hell: The true story of the FSSF, Forgotten Commandos of the Second World War. PA: Doubleday Canada.
- Hicks, Anne. "The Last Fighting General: The Biography of Robert Tryon Frederick" (Schiffer Pub Ltd, 2006) ISBN 0-7643-2430-6.
- Ross, Robert Todd, The Supercommandos First Special Service Force, 1942-1942, An Illustrated History (Atglen, PA: Schiffer Publishing Ltd. 2000).
- Springer, Joseph, The Black Devil Brigade: The True Story of the First Special Service Force, (Pacifica Military History, 2001).
- Werner, Brett. "First Special Service Force 1942 – 44" (Osprey Publishing, 2006) ISBN 1-84176-968-1.
- Wickham, Kenneth. "An Adjutant General Remembers" (Adjutant General's Corps Regimental Association, 1991).
- Wood, James. "'Matters Canadian' and the Problem with Being Special: Robert T. Frederick on the First Special Service Force." Canadian Military History 12, no. 4 (Autumn 2003): 17–33.
- Wood, James A. We Move Only Forward: Canada, the United States, and the First Special Service Force, 1942–1944 (St. Catharines, ON: Vanwell Publishing, 2006).
- Generals of World War II

Military offices
Preceded by William W. Eagles	Commanding General 45th Infantry Division; 1944–1945	Post deactivated
Preceded by Jens A. Doe	Commanding General 4th Infantry Division; 1949–1950	Succeeded by Harlan N. Hartness
