= 517th Parachute Regimental Combat Team =

Parachute infantry regiment of the US Army

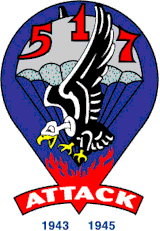
- Shoulder sleeve insignia
- Active: 1943–45
- Country: United States
- Branch: United States Army
- Type: Parachute infantry
- Size: Regimental combat team
- Part of: 17th Airborne Division; 82nd Airborne Division; 13th Airborne Division
- Nickname: Battlin’ Buzzards
- Motto: Attack
- Engagements: Italian campaign Operation Dragoon; Battle of the Bulge
- Decorations: French Croix de Guerre; Belgian Croix de Guerre

The 517th Parachute Regimental Combat Team (517th PRCT) was an airborne, specifically a parachute infantry, regiment of the United States Army that was formed in March 1943 during World War II, training at Camp Toccoa in the mountains of Northeast Georgia.

Although it began as the 517th Parachute Infantry Regiment (517th PIR), an element of the 17th Airborne Division, the 517th PRCT was formed when the 517th Parachute Infantry Regiment was combined with the 460th Parachute Field Artillery Battalion (460th PFAB) and the 596th Parachute Combat Engineer Company. The 517th saw most of its combat (in Italy, Southern France, and the Battle of the Bulge) as an independent unit. At the end of the war, the unit was eventually incorporated into the 13th Airborne Division.

Before its dissolution after only thirty-three months, the outfit of 2,500 men endured heavy fighting from Italy through the invasion of Southern France (Operation Dragoon), then the bitter winter in the Ardennes (in the Battle of the Bulge) and the final thrust into Germany.

During the unit's relatively brief lifetime, members of the 517th Regimental Parachute Combat Team received one Medal of Honor, six Distinguished Service Crosses, five Legions of Merit, 131 Silver Stars, 631 Bronze Stars, two Air Medals, four Soldiers Medals, 17 French Croix De Guerre, and 1,576 Purple Hearts—at the cost of 252 officers and men killed in action.

The 517th Parachute Regimental Combat Team was formally deactivated in 1946. Seven members of the 517th went on to attain the rank of general in the U.S. Army, and one became the Sergeant Major of the Army.

== History ==
=== Activation and training ===
The 517th Parachute Regimental Combat Team was formed from units of the 17th Airborne Division, which was activated on 15 March 1943. The division's parachute units were the 517th Parachute Infantry Regiment, the 460th Parachute Field Artillery Battalion and Company C, 139th Airborne Engineer Battalion. The 517th was at Camp Toccoa, Georgia; the 460th and C/139 were at Camp Mackall, North Carolina.

Paratrooper units were formed from volunteers, who were screened and trained at Camp Toccoa. The 517th was charged with screening the volunteers and assigning those qualified to either infantry, artillery or engineers. Officers of the 460th and C/139 were placed on temporary duty at Toccoa to help with the screening, and men assigned to those units were sent to Mackall.

On activation, the regiment had a total strength of nine officers, headed by newly appointed, 32-year-old, commanding officer Lt. Col. Louis A. Walsh Jr. Walsh had been with the Airborne since its earliest days and had spent three months as an observer with U.S. forces in the Southwest Pacific. Colonel Walsh was known for setting extremely high standards, including physical conditioning. In addition, each trooper was required to qualify as "expert" with his individual weapon, "sharpshooter" with another and "marksman" with all crew-served weapons in his platoon.

As units filled up, they were to be given basic training at their home stations and then sent for parachute qualification to Fort Benning, Georgia. After jump training, all units, including the 517th would join the 17th Airborne Division at Camp Mackall.

The battalions were filled in numerical sequence. The 1st Battalion, under Major William J. Boyle, was filled in April 1943, and the 2nd Battalion, under Major Richard J. Seitz, was nearly filled in May. By late June or early July, while Major Melvin Zais' 3rd Battalion was still waiting for its first recruit, with the flow of volunteers to Toccoa was suddenly turned off. The 3rd Battalion would be completed with Parachute School graduates who had already completed basic training.

The regiment was moved to Fort Benning for parachute training. The 517th completed jump school with no washouts, setting a record that has endured to this day. The 517th troopers were the first paratroopers to wear the steel helmet in jump training; until then a modified football helmet had been used. On completion of jump training the 1st and 2nd battalions moved on to Mackall while the 3rd remained at Benning to complete fill-up.

In February 1944, the regiment moved to Tennessee to take part in maneuvers being conducted by Headquarters U.S. Second Army. In March, it was announced that the parachute elements of the 17th Airborne Division—the 517th Parachute Infantry Regiment, the 460th Parachute Field Artillery Battalion, and Company C of the 139th Airborne Engineer Battalion, which was redesignated the 596th Airborne (Parachute) Engineer Company—were being pulled out for overseas shipment as the 517th Regimental Combat Team. The 517th RCT was expected to operate as a small division.

On return to Camp Mackall, while preparing for overseas movement, Colonel Walsh was replaced as commanding officer by Lt. Col. Rupert D. Graves, United States Military Academy '24, who came from command of the 551st Parachute Infantry Battalion.

In early May, the RCT components staged through Camp Patrick Henry near Newport News, Virginia. On 17 May, the 517th boarded the former Grace liner Santa Rosa, while the 460th and 596th loaded onto the Panama Canal ship Cristobal.

=== Italy ===
The RCT docked at Naples on 31 May 1944, the troopers filed down gangplanks into waiting railroad cars and were carried to a staging area in the Neapolitan suburb of Bagnoli. En route, Colonel Graves was handed an order directing the RCT to take part in the attack from Valmontone to Rome the next day. The 517th was ready to go, but since crew-served weapons, artillery and vehicles had been loaded separately it would have to be with only rifles. After this was pointed out, the order was cancelled and the RCT moved on to set up camp in "The Crater", the bed of a long-extinct volcano.

Gradually weapons and vehicles arrived. On 14 June the outfit struck tents, stowed away extra gear and moved to a beach to wait for LSTs to carry it to Anzio. The following day the convoy stopped off the coast of Anzio and the regimental and battalion commanders and staff went ashore where they were briefed on the enemy situation and informed that the destination was Civitavecchia. The convoy resumed sailing and the following morning the RCT disembarked over the beach unopposed. The RCT was then attached to Major General Fred L. Walker's 36th Infantry Division, which, under Major General Willis D. Crittenberger's IV Corps, was operating on the left of U.S. Fifth Army, under Lieutenant General Mark Clark. A long truck ride and a short foot march on 17 June brought the units south of Grosseto. Colonel Graves was handed an overlay marked with zones, objectives and phase lines. The regiment was to join the division's advance north from Grosseto the next day.

On 18 June 1944, in its first day of combat, the regiment suffered 40 to 50 casualties but inflicted several times that number upon the enemy. The next seven days were spent in almost continuous movement. The Germans tried to make an orderly withdrawal while the Americans pressed them hard. For the 460th the period was a continuous, 24-hour-a-day operation. Gun batteries continually leap-frogged each other; usually two batteries were in position while the other two were moving forward. The principle chore of the 596th Engineers was road reconnaissance and mine-sweeping.

On 19 June the 2nd Battalion captured the hilltop village of Montesario. On the left the 3rd Battalion moved through Montepescali against light resistance, going on to take Sticciano with 14 prisoners. Meanwhile, the 1st Battalion had been taking Monte Peloso. The RCT bivouacked overnight 22–23 June on a ridgeline south of Gavorrano. Next morning the RCT moved across the Piombino Valley and closed into all assembly area behind the 142nd Infantry Regiment. On 24 June the 2nd Battalion entered the eastern outskirts of Follonica under heavy artillery and Nebelwerfer fire.

During late June, the 517th went into IV Corps reserve and remained in that status until early July.

=== Operation Dragoon ===
The 517th had been sent to Italy in response to a Seventh Army request for airborne troops for Operation Anvil, the invasion of Southern France. Troops had been withdrawn from the line (including the 517th's) and air and naval forces were assembling.

On 2 July the Combined Chiefs of Staff issued a directive to the Commander-in-chief Mediterranean to go ahead with Anvil (renamed Dragoon) on 15 August. As a by-product of this directive the 517th RCT was released from IV Corps and moved to join the 1st Airborne Task Force in the Rome area.

The German Nineteenth Army was stationed along the Mediterranean coast. Four divisions and a corps headquarters were west of the Rhône. East of the Rhône the LXII Corps at Draguignan had a division each at Marseille and Toulon and one south-west of Cannes. There were an estimated 30,000 enemy troops in the assault area and another 200,000 within a few days march.

The planners decided early that an airborne force of division size would be needed. Since there was none in the Mediterranean, a force of comparable size would have to be improvised. In response, the 517th RCT, 509th and 551st Parachute Infantry Battalions and the 550th Airborne Infantry Battalion were provided. Other units in Italy were designated "gliderborne" to be trained by the 550th and the Airborne Training Center. By early July the concentration of airborne forces in the Rome area was almost complete. Two additional troop carrier wings totaling 413 aircraft were en route from England.

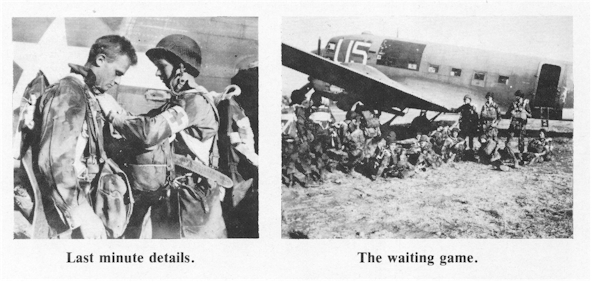
Preparing for Operation Dragoon

H-Hour and D-Day were tentatively set for 0800, 15 August 1944. The 517th RCT had been allocated 180 C-47 aircraft in four serials. The combat team was sealed off on 10 August. Maps, "escape kits" and invasion scripts were issued. Radio beacons would guide the serials from Elba to the northern tip of Corsica. From there, radar and Navy beacon ships would lead them to Agay, where each serial should descend to 1,500 feet (460 m), slow to 125 miles per hour, and home-in on its drop zone by beacons and lights to be put out by pathfinder teams. Each plane carried six equipment bundles in pararacks beneath its belly.

Most of the pathfinders missed their drop zones. The 517th team dropped early at 0328. North of La Ciotat the aircrews dropped 300 parachute dummies and a large quantity of "rifle simulators" which went off in firecracker-like explosions as they hit the ground.

The four serials bearing the 517th RCT began drops at 0430. First to arrive was Lt. Col. Dick Seitz' 2nd Battalion in Serial 6 flown by the 440th Group from Ombrone. Lt. Col. Mel Zais' 3rd Battalion was due next in the 439th Group's Serial 7 from Orbetello. The 460th Field Artillery (less Battery C) in Serial 8 with the 437th Group from Montalto fared better than the 3rd Battalion but not as well as the 2nd.

Twenty plane loads jumped early and were spread from Fréjus to the west. Last in was Serial 9 at 0453, flown by the 435th Group from Canino with Major Boyle's 1st Battalion and Battery C of the 460th. One platoon of the 596th had dropped with the 509th. One platoon had dropped with the 2nd Battalion and one with the 3rd Battalion. All told, only about 20 percent of the 517th RCT landed within two miles (3.2 km) of the DZ.

Actions throughout the next three days threw the Germans into a state of chaos. Enemy convoys were attacked, communication lines severed and German reinforcements were denied access to the beach landing areas. Towns and villages were occupied as troopers fought toward their objectives, capturing Le Muy, Les Arcs, La Motte and Draguignan.

Part of the 3rd Battalion had proceeded toward Fayence shattering enemy lines and installations as they moved. Remaining troops of the 3rd Battalion assembled from Seillans, Tourettes and Callian. Those troops landing to the east of Tourettes were joined by troops of the British 2nd Independent Parachute Brigade. The combined force annihilated a large German convoy speeding reinforcements to defensive positions near the beach.

Lt. Col. Boyle and a handful of 1st Battalion men made a gallant stand at Les Arcs. Remaining elements of the 1st Battalion captured assigned objectives.

The 460th Field Artillery, under Lt. Col. Ray Cato, had a bulk of its guns deployed and ready to fire by 1100.

The 2nd Battalion pushed through to join with the 1st Battalion as Germans began massing their forces on the outskirts of Les Arcs for an all-out counterattack. The 3rd Battalion completed a 40 km forced march as the RCT consolidated. The team attacked all assigned German positions clearing the way for Allied beach forces to push toward the north.

The 1st Platoon of Capt. Bob Dalrymple's 596th engineers had joined assault operations with elements of the 509th PIB near Le Muy. The 2nd Platoon conducted operation south of Les Arcs. The 3rd Platoon had joined attack operations with 3rd Battalion.

By D+3, German opposition within the airhead had ceased.

Within 18 hours 9,099 troops, 213 artillery pieces and anti-tank guns and 221 vehicles had been flown over 200 miles (320 km) across the Mediterranean and landed by parachute and glider in enemy-held territory. Despite widely scattered landings, all missions assigned had been accomplished within 48 hours. Airborne task force losses included 560 killed, wounded and missing, and 283 jump and glider casualties. 517th PIR losses included 19 killed, 126 wounded and 137 injured through D+3.

=== Southern France ===
As VI Corps moved west, the 1st Airborne Task Force reverted to Seventh Army control and was assigned to protect the Army's eastern flank, while the main forces moved up the Rhone Valley. The British 2nd Parachute Brigade returned to Italy and was replaced by the First Special Service Force. Protection of the Army's eastern flank meant moving as far east as practicable and then protecting the best ground available. The initial Task Force objective was the line Fayence-La Napoule. The 517th RCT was assigned the left, the Special Service Force the center and the 509th/551st PIR the right in a narrow strip along the coast.

The 2nd and 3rd Battalions were charged with the capture of Fayence and Callian. This was accomplished by 21 August. Saint-Cézaire fell to Companies G and I on the 22nd. During the attack, Company G had been pinned down. Company I surged through heavy fire up the mountainous slope to take the objective. For this action, it earned a commendation from Task Force Commander Maj. Gen. Robert T. Frederick.

Saint-Vallier, Grasse, Bouyon and La Roquette fell in quick succession. In the attack on La Roquette, Company E distinguished itself and received a commendation from General Frederick.

The RCT's momentum was slowed by a line of enemy fortifications extending from the Maritime Alps to the sea. On 3 September, a small force from the RCT drove into Monaco, liberating it from the Germans who had just left following a naval bombardment.

However, the Germans attempted to hold a series of forts at all costs. On 5 September, Company D succeeded in taking some high ground near Col de Braus. Heavy fighting ensued. Companies G and H were successful in capturing Col de Braus. A step closer to the heavily defended Sospel Valley.

The 1st Battalion, supported by 460th fire, pressed into Peira Cava. A red-letter day of the campaign occurred when Ventebren and Tete de Lavina were captured by the 2nd and 3rd Battalions.

The remainder of September was spent digging defensive positions in and around Peira Cava. The 517th RCT now held a thinly manned 15-mile (24 km) front, using mines and booby-traps to take the place of troopers. Attacks on Hill 1098 ended the month with the roar of artillery duels echoing through the Maritime Alps.

Despite heavy artillery fire, a patrol from Company F pushed into Sospel on 29 September. The Germans withdrew as Company B moved up to occupy Mount Agaisen. The siege of Sospel was over after 51 days of continuous fighting. Troopers fanned out in pursuit of the enemy. 517th involvement with the campaign was terminated on 17 November 1944. The RCT marched 48 km to La Colle. On 6 December the RCT moved from La Colle to entrain at Antibes for movement to Soissons and assignment to XVIII Airborne Corps.

The 517th PRCT suffered over 500 casualties and had 102 men killed in action. On 15 July 1946, the President of the Provisional Government of the French Republic issued Decision Number 247 awarding the French Croix de Guerre to the RCT.

=== Ardennes-Alsace (Battle of the Bulge) ===
All elements of the RCT were quartered in Soissons by 10 December. Every American airborne unit in Europe was now part of General Matthew B. Ridgway's XVIII Airborne Corps. This included the 82nd and 101st Airborne divisions just back from the Netherlands and the 517th and other separate units up from the Mediterranean. Additionally, the 17th Airborne Division was now in England and was scheduled to come across to France in the near future.

During the night of 15–16 December, the German Army launched its last great offensive of World War II, striking with three armies against weak American positions in the Ardennes region of Belgium and Luxembourg. The Allies were taken totally by surprise. The Germans made their main effort with the Sixth SS and Fifth Panzer armies, while their Seventh Army on the left made a limited holding attack.

Movement orders came for the 517th at 1100 on 21 December. One battery of the 460th and a platoon of the 596th were attached to each rifle battalion for movement.

Orders were received through XVIII Airborne Corps which directed the 1st Battalion to the 3rd Armored Division sector near Soy, Belgium. Pressure from German armor had made the situation so fluid that it was impossible to tell exactly where the front began. Company D was immediately attached to the 3rd Armored's Task Force Kane. This unit held the key point on which the front hinged. Companies A and B trucked northeast of Soy and was ordered to attack along the highway leading from Soy to Hotton.

The mission of the 1st Battalion was to take the commanding ground around Haid-Hits, then remove the enemy from the high ground at Sur-Les-Hys. The object was to facilitate a breakthrough and free surrounded elements of the 3rd Armored in Hotton.

Company B led the attack until forced to hold a line due to heavy tank and automatic weapons fire. It became necessary for Company A to bypass the planned route to Hotton. While this maneuver saved casualties, it was necessary to fight for every foot of ground along the entire route. Fighting on the return trip from Hotton to Soy was as heated as on the trip in. For its service in the Soy-Hotton mission 1st Battalion was awarded the Presidential Distinguished Unit Citation. The cost: 150 wounded and 11 men killed.

517th PRCT in the Battle of the Bulge.

While the 1st Battalion was attached to the 3rd Armored, the balance of the RCT was kept busy. The morning after arrival in Belgium, Company G was detailed as a security force for the XVIII Airborne Corps Command Post. The RCT (less 1st Battalion and Company G) was attached to the 30th Division, near Malmedy. The RCT headquarters opened at 1000, 23 December, at Xhoffraix. On Christmas Day the RCT was released from attachment to the 30th and returned to XVIII Airborne Corps control.

When the RCT was attached to the 30th Division, the 460th tied in with divisional artillery and fired 400 rounds in missions south and east of Malmedy.

During the nine days in December, the 460th fired more than 30 TOTs.

The fall of Manhay to the II SS Panzer Corps on Christmas Day sent shock waves throughout the Allied Command. From Manhay the Germans could continue north toward Liege or turn against the flank of the 3rd Armored and the 82nd Airborne. General Ridgeway was ordered to retake Manhay at all costs. The directive to recapture Manhay arrived in RCT Headquarters at 1400 on 26 December. The 517th was to attach one battalion to the 7th Armored Division for the mission.

The 3rd Battalion (less Company G) under Lt. Col. Forest S. Paxton was given the assignment. One platoon of the 596th Engineers and a section of the regimental demolitions platoons was attached. The battalion would have to cross two miles (3.2 km) of terrain covered with snow and underbrush, in darkness, before reaching the line of departure. The attack would commence at 0215 after a 10-minute barrage by eight battalions of artillery. The attack proceeded as planned after 5,000 rounds were fired in four concentrations. By 0330 the last pocket of resistance was eliminated. A counterattack at 0400 was driven off. The 3rd Battalion suffered 36 casualties, including 16 killed.

Early on New Year's Day, the RCT was attached to the 82nd Airborne and alerted to go on the attack. On 3 January, the RCT, acting as the left flank of the 82nd, attacked south along the Salm River. The 551st PIR, as an attached unit, fought through Basse-Bodeux, while the 2nd Battalion captured Trois-Ponts. The southerly attack continued to Mont-de-Fosse where advance elements were subjected to intense shelling.

The 1st Battalion moved through ground already taken to seize Saint-Jacques and Bergeval. The 3rd Battalion continued its attack across the Salm River and moved to the east. On 9 January, they circled around the 551st and closed on the bank of the Salm at Petit-Halleux. That night, advance details of the 75th Infantry Division arrived to make arrangements for relieving the 82nd in the area. To get them off to a good start, 3/517 under direction of the 504th crossed the Salm and seized Grand Halleux.

Colonel Graves received orders on 11 January that the RCT (less 2nd Battalion, attached to the 7th Armored was attached to the 106th Infantry Division. The immediate job was to relieve the 112th Infantry at Stavelot and along the northern bank of the Ambleve. This was accomplished by the 1st Battalion on 12 January.

A new attack was launched at 0800 on 13 January, to seize a line running from Spineux, north of Grand Halleux, to Poteaux, eight miles (13 km) south of Malmedy. The 1st and 2nd Battalions moved to the south capturing Butay, Lusnie, Henumont, Coulee, Logbierme and established blocks at Petit Thier and Poteaux. The RCT had now reached the limits of the prescribed advance.

While most of the RCT had been involved with the 106th and 30th Infantry Division, the 2nd Battalion moved from Goronne to Neuville for assignment to the 7th Armored. Colonel Seitz and his men were assigned to Combat Command A at Polleux. On 20 January, Task Force Seitz attacked south from an assembly area near Am Kreuz to capture Auf der Hardt woods and formed defensive positions on the southern edge. On reaching the objective, a patrol was sent to the village of Hochkreuz.

At 1500 Company F was detailed to join a tank company for an attack on Born.

On 22 January, the task force led CCA through In Der Eidt Woods and closed in attack positions a mile north-west of Hunnange. At 1700 TOT concentrations were fired on Hunnange and the attack moved out. By dark Task Force Seitz had overrun Neider Emmels and Hunnange and was in contact with other 7th Armored forces. Defensive positions were taken facing south and southwest. A road block was established at Lorentswaldchen and patrols were sent to the outskirts of St. Vith. At 1400 on 23 January, Combat Command B passed through Task Force Seitz and completed the capture of St. Vith. On 24 January orders were given to clear the Saint Vith-Ambleve road that remained in enemy hands. At 0600 on 25 January, the battalion moved out for its attack position. By 1400 the objectives were secured.

On 1 February the 517th PRCT joined the 82nd Airborne Division near Honsfeld. Next day the 1st Battalion took up a blocking position to protect the northern flank of the 325th Glider Infantry Regiment while the 3rd Battalion moved into position to support if required. All objectives of the attack plan were met, and on 3 February, the RCT received orders attaching it to the 78th Infantry Division at Simmerath.

=== Battle of Hurtgen Forest ===
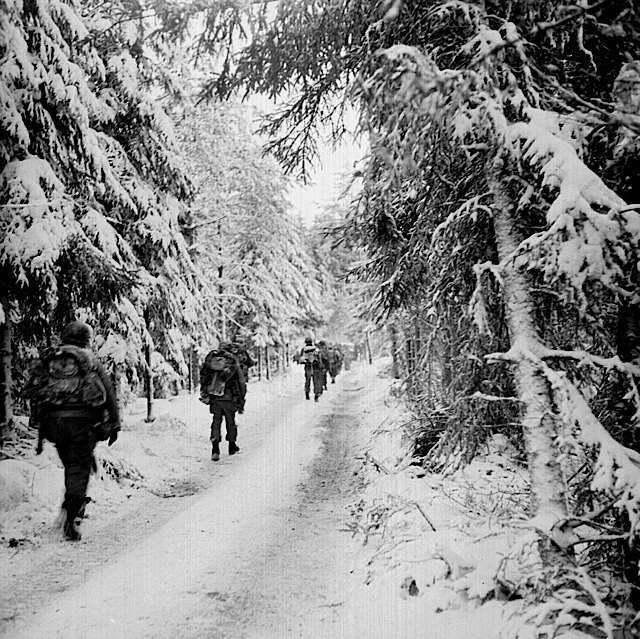
517th PRCT in the Hurtgen Forest.

The 78th was to attack east on 6 February to seize Schmidt and the Schwammenauel Dam. The 517th RCT was to move north to the Kleinhau-Bergstein area, relieve elements of the 8th Infantry Division and attack south from Bergstein during darkness on 5 February to seize the Schmidt-Nideggen Ridge where the Germans had prepared strong defenses. By 0600 on the morning of 5 February, all units had closed at Kleinhau. The German line ran from Zerkall west and South of Hill 400 to the Kall River.

After dark the 2nd and 3rd battalions moved into attack positions. Five to six hundred yards below Bergstein, both battalions hit minefields and concertina wire. The troopers attempted to move forward by crawling and probing, but all efforts proved futile. Men were blown up by Schu mines, Teller mines and "Bouncing Bettys." In Bergstein the troopers found some protection from small-arms fire but little else.

In mid-morning the 596th Engineers began working in relays to clear a lane through the largest minefield encountered by the Allies in World War II while under direct enemy observation and fire. For 36 hours the 596th continued this heroic effort. In the 1st Battalion area, Company A sent a patrol from Hill 400 to Zerkall.

In the early afternoon of 7 February, Colonel Graves was informed that the 517th was released from the 78th Infantry Division and attached to the 82nd Airborne in place. Task Force A had been formed, consisting of the 517th and the 505th Parachute Infantry. The 517th was to continue its planned attack.

During darkness on 7 February, the 1st and 2nd battalions prepared to go on the attack. At 2145 the 2nd Battalion moved down the lane through the minefields. By 0100 Company E and the remains of Company F were at the edge of the Kall Ravine. At 0145 the 1st Battalion was 400 yards (370 m) southeast of Hill 400. North of the Kall, the 2nd Battalion troopers came under savage machine gun and mortar fire. The 1st Battalion rearranged to Hill 400. At noon the 3rd Battalion sent a patrol west to contact the 505th at the predesignated point on the Kall. Three efforts to reach the point were turned back by machine gun fire.

The rifle strengths of the 517th's battalions, now reduced to company size, were relieved by the 508th Parachute Infantry Regiment that night.

December and January casualties were 653: 565 wounded and 78 killed. February casualties in Germany were 287: 235 wounded and 52 killed. These numbers do not include evacuations attributable to disease and frozen extremities.

=== Last days of World War II ===
After being relieved by the 508th PIR, the RCT was trucked to the railhead at Aachen, Germany. After a two-day train trip, the RCT arrived at Laon, France, where they settled in for a two-day stay. On 15 February, XVIII Airborne Corps notified Colonel Graves that the RCT was assigned to the newly arrived 13th Airborne Division and was to proceed to Joigny, France, 70 miles (110 km) southeast of Paris.

As the RCT closed in at Joigny on 21 February, the RCT was dissolved. The 460th became part of the 13th Airborne Division Artillery and the 596th Engineers were merged with Company B, 129th Airborne Engineer Battalion.

The 517th PIR was assigned to the 13th Airborne Division; they were to take part in Operation Varsity, the airborne crossing of the Rhine river. However, prior to the operation, the 13th's participation in the attack was called off. The 517th, then attached to the 17th Airborne Division, was slated to take part in Operation Coronet, the airborne invasion of the Japanese Home Islands, which was also called off after V-J Day.

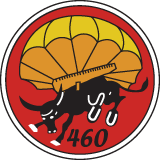
460th PFAB Logo

=== Statistics ===
The 517th Parachute Regimental Combat Team accumulated over 150 combat days during five campaigns on battlefields in Italy, France, Belgium and Germany.

The battalion casualty rate was 81.9 percent. The team suffered 1,576 casualties and had 252 men killed in action.

Private First Class Melvin E. Biddle of B Company, 1st Battalion, 517th PIR was awarded the Medal of Honor for actions during the Soy-Hotton engagement.

On 15 February 1945, elements of the RCT were assigned to the 13th Airborne Division. The 13th was deactivated in February 1946.

In addition to the one Medal of Honor, troopers of the 517th PRCT earned 131 Silver Stars, 631 Bronze Stars, 1,576 Purple Hearts, 6 Distinguished Service Crosses, 5 Legion of Merits, 4 Soldier's Medals, 2 Air Medals and 17 French Croix de Guerres.

=== Helmets ===
During World War II, the 517th Parachute Infantry Regiment was part of the First Airborne Task Force, that had the mission of jumping behind enemy lines in south eastern France for Operation Dragoon on 15 August 1944.

It is thought that during the preparation for this combat jump, it was noted that there was a serious lack of paratrooper helmets available for use by the unit. To palliate this lack, standard infantry M1 helmets were specially modified by the unit riggers, with a new chinstrap being installed. The infantry standard chinstrap was shortened on both sides, and a replacement buckle and makeshift chincup was sewn into place. The modified chinstrap was designed to fit to the wearers chin as tightly as possible, so as to avoid losing the helmet during the jump.

The 517th Parachute Regimental Combat Team is the only unit of the US Army to have used this type of modified helmet during World War II. The modified helmets can immediately be traced back to the 517th PRCT and Operation Dragoon. It is suspected that approximately 3,000 such helmets were made, most of which were camouflaged with spray paint as well, adding to the unique look of these helmets.

== Today ==
The alumni group of the 517th, the 517 PRCT Association, still holds an annual reunion, prints a quarterly newsletter, and has an almost daily email newslist. There is also an auxiliary group, consisting of children, relatives, and friends of the 517th who actively assist in the events and maintain the history of the unit.
