= 1st Airborne Task Force (Allied) =

Military unit

- Active: 11 July – 23 November 1944
- Country: United States; United Kingdom; Canada
- Allegiance: Allies of World War II
- Branch: United States Army; British Army
- Type: Airborne forces
- Role: Parachute infantry
- Size: 9,000
- Engagements: Operation Dragoon

Commanders
- Notable commanders: Robert T. Frederick

The 1st Airborne Task Force was a short-lived Allied airborne unit formed during World War II for Operation Dragoon, the invasion of Southern France. Created in July 1944 under the command of Major General Robert T. Frederick, it took part in the Dragoon landings on 15 August 1944, securing the area northwest of the landing beaches before advancing towards the French–Italian border as part of the United States Seventh Army. The unit was disbanded in November 1944.

== Formation ==
In the initial plans for the invasion of France it was proposed that two forces would land simultaneously in Normandy and in southern France in June 1944, attacking the Germans from the north and south in a classic pincer movement, after which the southern forces would head east to aid Allied forces in Italy. However it was soon realized that there were not enough landing ships or men available to carry out both operations at the same time, so the southern invasion ("Operation Anvil") was postponed. The southern invasion (now "Operation Dragoon") was planned for August 1944, and all airborne forces were allocated to a new unit formed on 11 July 1944 as the Seventh Army Airborne Division (Provisional). This was redesignated the 1st Airborne Task Force on the 21st.

In order to form the 1ABTF airborne units were withdrawn from combat in Italy. These were the U.S. 509th Parachute Infantry Battalion and U.S. 517th Parachute Regimental Combat Team, and the British 2nd Independent Parachute Brigade. Added to them were the U.S. 550th Glider Infantry Battalion and U.S. 551st Parachute Infantry Battalion, both of which had previously been stationed in Panama, and neither of which had seen combat. Two Free French parachute battalions had originally been assigned in early July, but disagreements over their deployment with General de Gaulle meant that the troops were not made available, and so the British 2nd Parachute Brigade was assigned to the operation on the proviso that they would be returned to operations in Italy once the beachhead was firmly established.

== Operation Dragoon ==
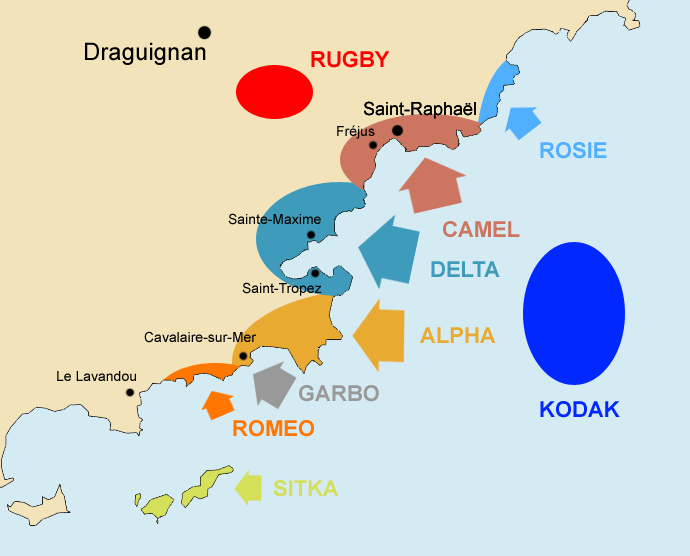
Map showing landing zones for "Dragoon".

1ABTF's part in "Dragoon", was codenamed "Operation Rugby". They were to land around the village of Le Muy, midway between Draguignan, and the landing beaches at Fréjus–Saint-Raphaël. There were three Drop Zone/Landing Zones:

- The British 2nd Parachute Brigade were assigned an area of open fields and vineyards, designated DZ/LZ "O", 400 yards north of Le Muy on the northern side of the Nartuby River. The 550th Airborne Infantry Battalion would also land there later in the day.
- The U.S. 517th PRCT were assigned an area of narrow fields about two miles west of Le Muy, designated DZ/LZ "A", south of the Nartuby River. The 1st Battalion, 551st Parachute Infantry Regiment would follow later in the day.
- The 509th PIB and the 463rd Field Artillery were assigned an area, designated DZ "C", about two miles south-east of Le Muy. This area, lying in a basin between two ridges with hills to the east and west, was steep, rocky, and wooded, with only small areas of level and open ground at either end. It was reluctantly chosen in order to put troops on the high ground dominating Le Muy from the south.

=== The landings ===
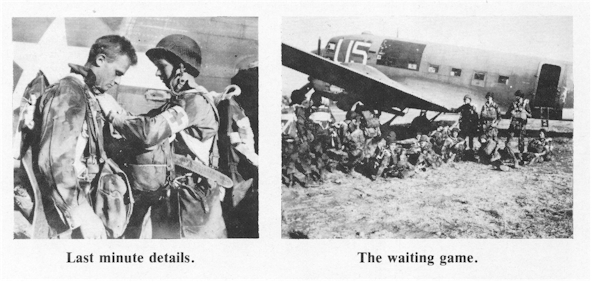
Troops of the 517th PRCT prepare for the landings.

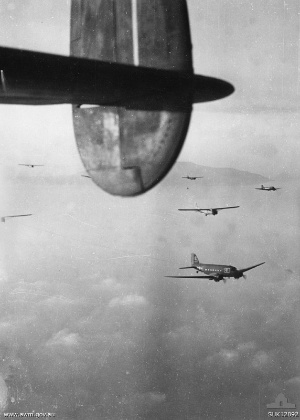
British gliders towed by C47 Dakota aircraft over Southern France for the Allied airborne invasion.

On the night of the operation heavy fog meant that the initial landings were scattered over a wide area, and by dawn only about 60% of the task force troops had assembled in their drop zones. The gliders bringing the British artillery support at 08:00 had to abort their mission, though landings and drops later in the day were more successful. Many gliders were damaged on landing, but casualties were generally light.

=== In combat ===
While the village of Le Muy itself remained in enemy hands, the British secured the high ground to the east and north, while the Americans did the same in the west and south. The 550th Battalion attempted to secure Le Muy that night, but were repulsed. Apart from seizing the village, the 1ABTF had completed its assigned mission, establishing a strong position astride the Argens valley preventing the enemy advancing on the beach-head. On the morning of the 16th the 550th attacked Le Muy again, and by 14:45 it was taken – between 500 and 700 prisoners were captured. Early on the morning of the 17th forward elements of the U.S. 36th Division arrived at Le Muy from the beach-head, and then continued their advance towards Draguignan.

Following "Operation Rugby" the 1ABTF moved north-east, covering the right flank of the Seventh Army, and liberating Cannes and Nice, before being deployed to the Maritime Alps in a static role, mounting patrols and keeping a close watch on the Germans in the area of the Franco-Italian border.

The 2nd (Independent) Parachute Brigade was released on 26 August 1944. Six weeks later it was deployed to Greece. In November 1944 1ABTF was sent to Soissons to rest and refit, and was disbanded on 23 November 1944, with most of the units being attached to the XVIII Airborne Corps.

== Order of battle ==
=== Main force ===
The 1ABTF was composed of the following units:

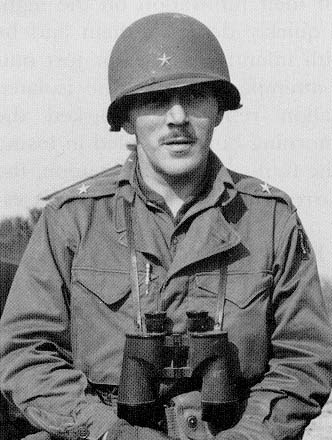
Robert T. Frederick (as a Brigadier General)

- 1ABTF HHC – Maj. Gen. Robert T. Frederick
- U.S. 509th Parachute Infantry Battalion – Lt. Col. William P. Yarborough
  - 463rd Parachute Field Artillery Battalion – Lt. Col. John Cooper
- U.S. 517th Parachute Regimental Combat Team
  - 517th Parachute Infantry Regiment – Col. Rupert D. Graves
  - 460th Parachute Field Artillery Battalion – Lt. Col. Raymond L. Cato
  - 596th Airborne Engineer Company – Capt. Robert W. Dalrymple
- U.S. 550th Airborne Infantry Battalion (Glider) – Lt. Col. Edward I. Sachs
- U.S. 551st Parachute Infantry Battalion – Lt. Col. Wood G. Joerg
  - 602d Glider Field Artillery Battalion – Maj. George M. Hunt
- British 2nd (Independent) Parachute Brigade – Brig. Charles Hilary Vaughan Pritchard [detached 26 August]
  - 4th Parachute Battalion – Lt. Col. H.B. Coxen
  - 5th (Scottish) Parachute Battalion – Lt. Col. D.R. Hunter
  - 6th (Royal Welch) Parachute Battalion – Lt. Col. V.W. Barlow
  - 1st Independent Parachute Platoon (Pathfinders)
- 1st Special Service Force (U.S./Canada) – Col. Edwin A. Walker [attached 22 August]

=== Support units ===
- 512th Airborne Signal Company
- 887th Airborne Engineer Aviation Company
- Antitank Company, 442nd Infantry Regiment
- 552nd Antitank Company (Note: The 552nd Antitank Company was formed in July 1944, in Rome, specifically for this operation. Since the 442nd became available while the 552nd was in training and took very little time to train on the British 6lb. guns needed for gliders, it went in first. But the 552nd was always on the complement of troops slated for this operation (and the 1st ABTF) and relieved the 442nd mid-October 1944 supporting the 1st ABTF member units still in the area.)
- Company A, 2nd Chemical Mortar Battalion
- Company A, 83d Chemical Mortar Battalion
- Detachment, 3d Ordnance Company
- 676th Medical Collecting Company

=== Base support units ===
- 3358th Quartermaster Truck Company
- 334th Quartermaster Depot Company
- 172d Detail Issues Depot, British Heavy Aerial Resupply Company
- 904th Air Base Security Battalion

=== Airlift units ===
- Provisional Troop Carrier Air Division – Gen. Paul L. Williams
  - 50th Troop Carrier Wing
  - 51st Troop Carrier Wing
  - 53d Troop Carrier Wing
  - Glider Pilot Regiment

=== Fighter Support ===
  - 31st Fighter Group (13 August 1944 ~ 16 August 1944)

== See also ==
- Operation Dragoon order of battle
- 2nd Parachute Brigade in Southern France
