= 517th =

517th may refer to:

- 517th Air Defense Group, disbanded United States Air Force organization
- 517th Airlift Squadron (517 AS), part of the 3d Wing at Elmendorf Air Force Base, Alaska
- 517th Parachute Infantry Regiment (United States) (517th PIR), separate infantry regiment of the United States Army
- 517th Parachute Regimental Combat Team (517th PRCT), one of the U.S. Army's first elite combat units
- 517th Strategic Fighter Squadron, inactive United States Air Force unit

== See also ==
- 517 (number)
- 517, the year 517 (DXVII) of the Julian calendar
- 517 BC
