= Pathfinder (military) =

Specialized soldier who prepares sites for airborne operations

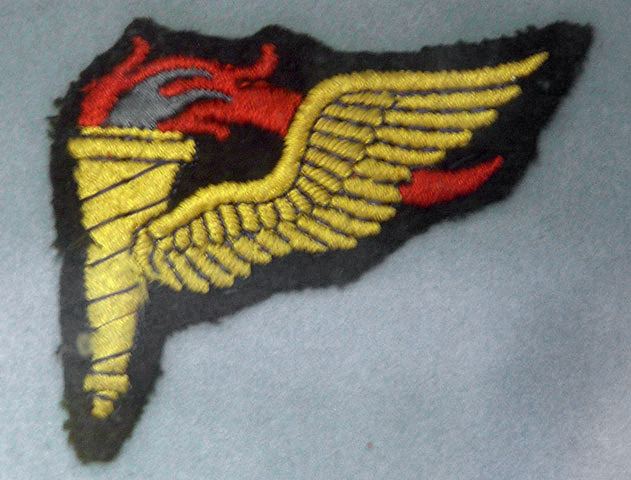
One version of the patch worn on the uniforms of American pathfinders who served during World War II

In military organizations, a pathfinder is a specialized soldier inserted or dropped into place in order to set up and operate drop zones, pickup zones, and helicopter landing sites for airborne operations, air resupply operations, or other air operations in support of the ground unit commander. Pathfinders first appeared in World War II, and continue to serve an important role in today's modern armed forces, providing commanders with the option of flexibly employing air assets. There was a group of pilots who were also designated pathfinders. They flew C-47 (DC-3) aircraft and were the lead planes followed by paratroop transports, used for dropping paratroopers into designate drop zones such as on D-Day, the Normandy Invasion.

== History ==
=== United Kingdom ===
During the Second World War small groups of parachute soldiers were formed into pathfinder units, to parachute ahead of the main force. Their tasks were to mark the drop zones (DZ) or landing zones (LZ), set up radio beacons as a guide for the aircraft carrying the main force and to clear and protect the area as the main force arrived. The units were formed into two companies to work with the two British airborne divisions created during the war, the 1st and 6th.

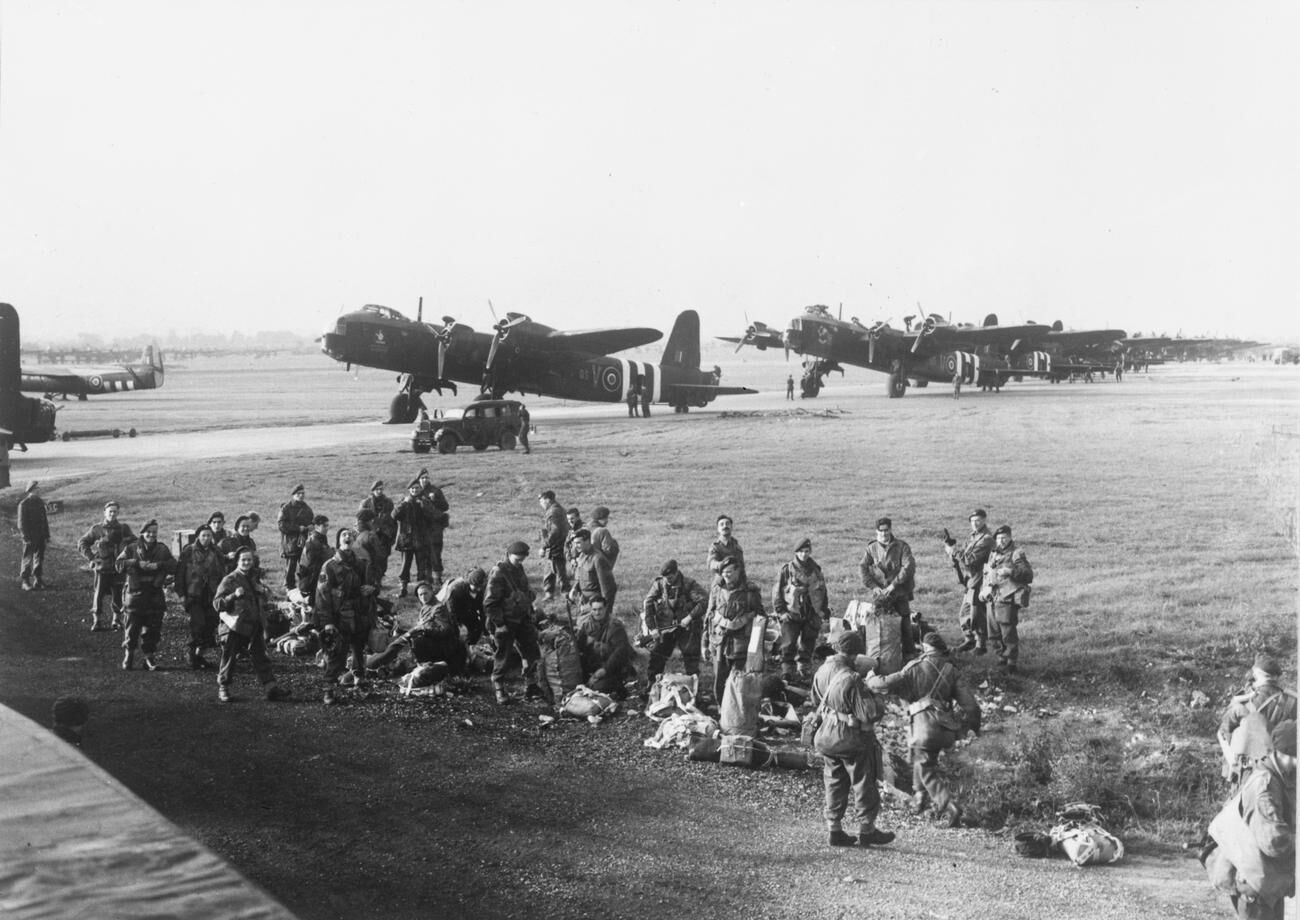
Paratroopers of 3 Platoon, 21st Independent Parachute Company, assemble at RAF Fairford, Gloucestershire in preparation for Operation Market Garden, September 1944.

The 21st Independent Parachute Company was formed in June 1942 and became part of the 1st Airborne Division, then commanded by Major General Frederick "Boy" Browning, considered to be the father of the British Army's airborne forces. The 22nd Independent Parachute Company was raised in May 1943 and was part of the 6th Airborne Division, under the command of Major General Richard "Windy" Gale.

During the Allied invasion of Sicily (codenamed 'Operation Husky') the 21st Independent Parachute Company parachuted ahead of the main force during Operation Fustian to capture the Primosole Bridge on the night of 13/14 July 1943. They then took part in Operation Slapstick, part of the Allied invasion of Italy, landing by sea at Taranto on 9 September. The company, with most of the rest of the 1st Airborne Division, after fighting briefly in the early stages of the Italian Campaign, returned to the United Kingdom in December 1943, but left an independent platoon behind in Italy to work with the 2nd Independent Parachute Brigade Group. Held in reserve and unused for the Allied Operation Overlord, the invasion of Normandy, the company took part in Operation Market Garden, landing at the Dutch town of Arnhem on the night of 17 September 1944. After marking the DZs and LZs the company was trapped with the rest of the division in the Oosterbeek Perimeter, suffering heavy casualties in what is now known as the Battle of Arnhem. The company did not see any further action in the war.

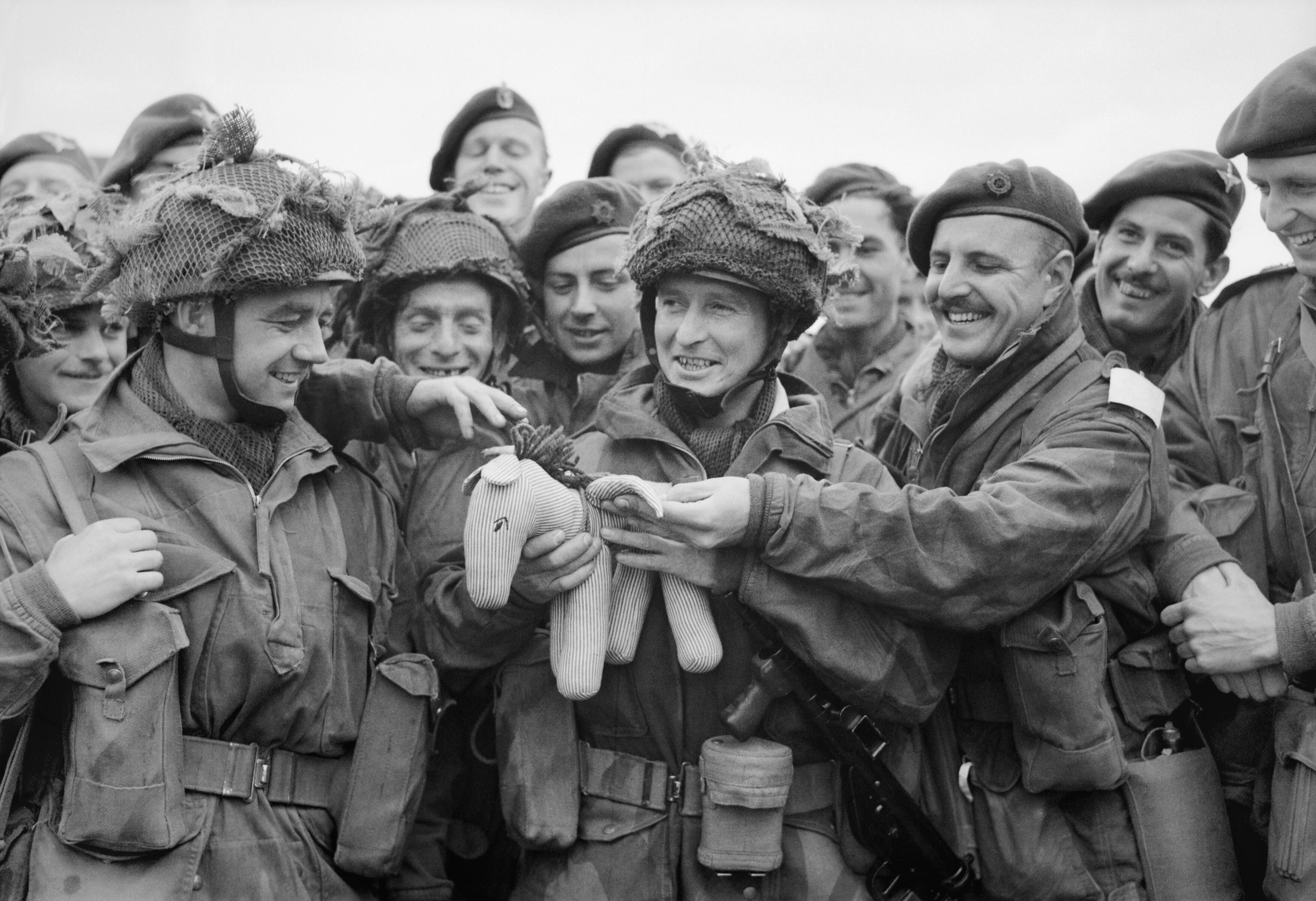
Paratroopers of the 22nd Independent Parachute Company with their toy mascot 'Pegasus' at RAF Harwell, Berkshire, preparing for Operation Tonga the initial airborne element of Overlord, 5 June 1944.

Towards the end of the war the 21st Independent Parachute Company went with the 1st Airborne Division as part of Operation Doomsday to disarm the German forces in Norway between May and October 1945. It was then attached to the 6th Airborne Division serving in Mandate Palestine where it was still serving in September 1946, when it was disbanded.

The 22nd Independent Parachute Company were the lead elements of the 6th Airborne Division's drop into Normandy as part of Operation Tonga in the early hours of D-Day, 6 June 1944. The company, together with the rest of the division, remained in Normandy, acting as standard line infantry, until the 6th Airborne Division advanced to the River Seine in August, returning to England in September but was sent to Belgium in December, due to the German Ardennes offensive, again fighting as standard infantrymen. The company then participated in Operation Varsity, the airborne component of Operation Plunder, the British assault crossing of the Rhine in late March 1945 and then the subsequent Western Allied invasion of Germany.

The 22nd Independent Parachute Company was sent with the 5th Parachute Brigade, part of the 6th Airborne Division but temporarily detached, to the Far East in mid-1945, remaining there until disbanded in July 1946.

Post war the Regular Army's parachute force was reduced to the 16th Parachute Brigade. To provide this formation with a pathfinder capacity the Guards Independent Parachute Company was formed in 1948 on the disbandment of Composite Guards Parachute Battalion. The Company deployed on a wide variety of operations between 1948 and 1977. It was deployed to Borneo during the Borneo Confrontation where it was used provide reinforcement to the SAS and its professional performance resulted in the formation of G Sqn of that regiment in 1966.

The pathfinder role in the Territorial Army (TA), the British Army's part-time reserve, was continued by 16 (Lincoln) Independent Parachute Company as part of 44th Parachute Brigade (V).

The 16 Air Assault Brigade employs elite pathfinders in their Pathfinder Platoon.

=== United States ===
During World War II, the pathfinders were a group of volunteers selected within the Airborne units who were specially trained to operate navigation aids to guide the main airborne body to the drop zones. The pathfinder teams (sticks) were made up of a group of eight to twelve pathfinders and a group of six bodyguards whose job was to defend the pathfinders while they set up their equipment. The pathfinder teams dropped approximately thirty minutes before the main body in order to locate designated drop zones and provide radio and visual guides for the main force in order to improve the accuracy of the jump. These navigational aids included compass beacons, colored panels, Eureka radar sets, and colored smoke. When they jumped, the pathfinders many times would encounter less resistance than the follow-up waves of paratroopers, simply because they had the element of surprise on their side. Once the main body jumped, the pathfinders then joined their original units and fought as standard airborne infantry.

==== Early operations ====
The first two U.S. airborne campaigns, the drops into French North Africa (Operation Torch) and on Sicily (Operation Husky) did not make use of pathfinders. The jump into North Africa, made up of men of the 509th Parachute Infantry Battalion (509th PIB), resulted in its men being scattered to places such as Algeria, Gibraltar, and Morocco when they ran into bad weather and got lost. The next major airborne operation took place in the invasion of Sicily in July 1943. Many of the same problems were encountered, as the men were scattered as far as 65 miles from their drop zones, due to high winds and poor navigation. In fact, some of the paratroopers landed so far off course that it was a matter of weeks before they finally found their way back to Allied lines.

In a history of the 509th PIB's wartime actions titled "Stand in the Door! The wartime history of the 509th Parachute Infantry," authors and 509th veterans Charles H. Doyle and Terrell Stewart described how their unit formed the first U.S. Army pathfinder unit.

[General James] Gavin likes to claim credit for "inventing" Pathfinders, pointing to bad drops in Sicily as the cause. Let us set the record straight: The 509th, the world's most experienced bad drop specialists, first saw the need for them. Pathfinders were separate teams of "advance men" who jumped in ahead of main forces to set up beacons and other guides to incoming aircraft.

The 509th's Scout Company was the first specialized Pathfinder group. In the U.S. Army, it started the training and experimentation necessary to develop the concept at Oujda. With fragments of practical knowledge from the British Airborne, company commander Captain Howland and his XO 1st Lt. Fred E. Perry worked hard to develop usable techniques. Perry recalls: "Everyone knew through hard experience that the Air Corps needed help to drop us on the correct drop zone. We organized the Scout Company for this purpose. This was later made into a Scout Platoon under my command, consisting of 10 enlisted and myself. We were equipped with a British homing radio and U.S. Navy Aldis lamps, which radiated a beam to guide planes. We trained on this procedure until the invasion at Salerno.

In the meantime, the 82nd Airborne Division arrived from the States on May 10 and camped near the 509th at Oujda. We were attached to them. The 82nd would not buy our Scout Platoon idea, but they sure found out in a hurry after Sicily that we really had something that was needed.

At the time, Major General Matthew Ridgway and his "All-American" staff thought they knew it all. Impressed with themselves, although they were not jumpers or experienced glider troopers, they airily dismissed the 509th and its fresh combat experiences, as well as any nonstandard/Limey concept. They would learn the hard way.

==== Sicily and Italy ====
After the serious problems uncovered during the parachute drop in the Allied invasion of Sicily, the Allied high command questioned the utility of parachute infantry primarily because of the difficulty of dropping the infantry as cohesive units rather than as scattered groups. A review of procedures and methods resulted in the establishment of the pathfinder teams to aid navigation to drop zones. The pathfinder forces were only formed about a week in advance of the jump at Paestum, Italy, on September 13, 1943. When the majority of the pathfinders landed directly on target, they were able to set up their radar sets and Krypton lights on the drop zone. A quarter of an hour later, the main body of paratroopers from the 504th Parachute Infantry Regiment (504th PIR) landed right on the middle of the drop zone.

The same night, the newly formed pathfinder detachment from the 509th PIB saw their first action in that capacity at Avellino, Italy. Compared to the successful pathfinders at Paestum, those of the 509th at Avellino had markedly less success. However, this was not their fault, as the mountainous terrain surrounding the area deflected the radar signals and caused the pilots to become disoriented.

==== Normandy ====
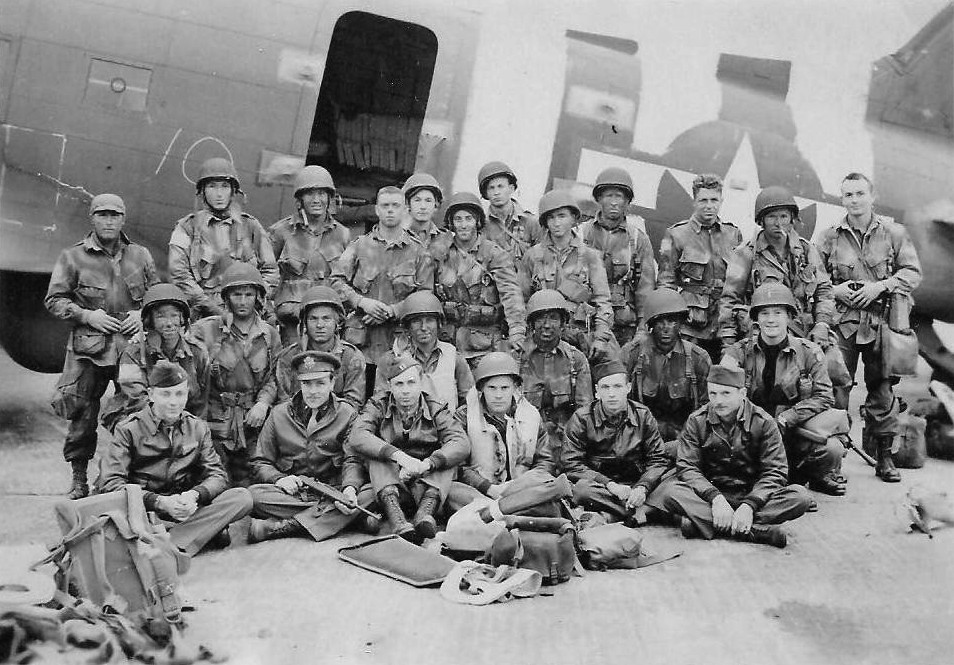
U.S. Army pathfinders of the 2nd Battalion, 505th Parachute Infantry Regiment (505th PIR), and C-47 Skytrain flight crew just before D-Day, June 1944

Airborne and pathfinder forces did not see combat again until June 6, 1944, at the commencement of the D-Day landings of Operation Overlord. Pathfinders taking part in the Allied parachute assault on Normandy, France, on June 6, 1944, were trained by the Pathfinder School at RAF North Witham (U.S. Army Air Force (USAAF) designation 'Army Air Force Station 479') Lincolnshire.

At 21:30 on June 5, about 200 pathfinders began to take off from North Witham, for the French Cotentin Peninsula, in 20 Douglas C-47 Skytrain aircraft of the 9th Troop Carrier Command Pathfinder Group. They began to drop at 00:15 on June 6, to prepare the drop zones for the 82nd and 101st Airborne Divisions. They were the first American troops on the ground on D-Day. However, their aircraft were scattered by low clouds and anti-aircraft fire. Many never found their assigned landing zones. Some of the landing zones were too heavily defended. Some were flooded.

The low clouds and extremely intense anti-aircraft fire caused the pathfinder sticks to be dropped off course, with only one stick landing in the correct place (Ambrose, p. 196). Their radar beacons did work somewhat effectively; even though the pathfinders set up their equipment off course, many of the sticks of follow up paratroopers landed clustered near these beacons.

However, the lights proved ineffective, as most were not set up due to the clouds and misdrops of the pathfinders. While the bad weather and heavy anti-aircraft curtailed the effectiveness of the pathfinder teams on D-Day, the overall airborne drop was a success. This was true because the misplacement and scattering of the airborne forces deceived the German High Command and, as happened in Sicily, convincing them that there were far more American paratroopers present than there actually were in France.

==== Southern France ====
The invasion of the South of France took place on August 15, 1944, in the form of Operation Dragoon (Rottman, p. 80). The 509th PIB, the 517th Parachute Regimental Combat Team, and the 551st PIB formed the American airborne contingent of the invasion, dropping into the French Riviera in the early hours of the morning. As had been the problem with previous night drops, such as Normandy, the pathfinders were misdropped when the planes carrying them got lost. Further delays were encountered when these men had to find each other on the ground, work their way through a heavily wooded area near the town of Le Muy, and fight off German soldiers in the process.

Due to the ineffective placement of the pathfinders, the follow-up waves of paratroopers were not dropped in the right place either. This was further exacerbated by pilot error, as many of the pilots opted to drop their paratroopers at too high an altitude; the result was that these men were widely scattered. An entire stick of men of the 509th PIB were dropped into the sea and drowned near Saint-Tropez. Much like the paratroopers in Normandy, however, the overall operation was a success as the paratroopers still managed to accomplish their missions and capture their objectives in conjunction with the seaborne landing forces.

==== Netherlands ====
Operation Market Garden, the brainchild of British Field Marshal Sir Bernard Montgomery, commander of the 21st Army Group, which took place on September 17, 1944, was the next major airborne operation into the Netherlands, the largest to date. The mission of the airborne troops was to capture a series of bridges from Best in the south, to Arnhem (by the British 1st Airborne Division) in the north. This would then allow the ground element to cross the bridges in a rapid manoeuvre. While the operation ultimately failed due to delays among the ground forces, the airborne divisions accomplished most of their missions; this was due in large part to the efforts of the pathfinder forces. A combination of the drop taking place in broad daylight and that the Germans were not expecting an airborne attack allowed the pathfinders to land on target and guide in the rest of the paratroopers to the proper locations. This is especially remarkable considering that the number of pathfinder sticks and the number of men in each stick were reduced to the bare minimum (one per drop zone) for this drop.

==== Battle of the Bulge ====
During the Battle of the Bulge in December 1944, the 101st Airborne Division, along with elements of numerous other units, was trucked to the Belgian town of Bastogne in order to secure and defend the town which contained a major road junction. By December 22, 1944, the units defending the town were surrounded and running low on supplies. Two sticks of pathfinders of the 101st parachuted into besieged Bastogne to set up signal beacons to guide in a flight of planes to resupply the Allied units in that town; the resupply succeeded, thanks to the efforts of the pathfinders. There were pathfinder trained personnel already in Bastogne, but they were unable to perform their pathfinder duties without the equipment that was parachuted in with the pathfinders.

==== Into Germany ====
A similar mission was carried out by the pathfinders of the 506th PIR at Prüm, Germany, on February 13, 1945. Their objective was to set beacons to guide in planes to resupply the surrounded 4th Infantry Division, and they succeeded; this allowed the division to fight off the Germans surrounding them.

The only major airborne operation into Germany came on March 24, 1945, in the form of Operation Varsity, the crossing of the Rhine River by American, British and Canadian paratroopers. Because it was another daylight drop (navigation should not be a problem) and that the drop zones were heavily defended, pathfinders were not dropped prior to the main paratrooper forces in this operation. Instead, some set up beacons on the Allied side of the river, and others dropped with the main paratrooper force to set up smoke and panels as a final navigational aid.

==== The Pacific Theater ====
There was a much lesser demand for pathfinders and airborne forces in general in the jungles and islands of the Pacific. The 511th PIR was the only Pacific based airborne unit to employ pathfinders, which it did in the Philippines. They were used twice, at Tagaytay Ridge in early February 1945, and again on June 23, 1945. However, neither time did they parachute in to mark the drop zones; rather, they infiltrated over a beach in one instance, and across a river in the other.

==== Post–World War II ====
The divisional pathfinder units of World War II were assigned to the subordinate parachute infantry regiments. In 1947, the first divisional pathfinder platoon was organized in the Headquarters Company, 82nd Airborne Division. Pathfinders were also established in the 11th Airborne Division, at that time on occupation duty in Japan.

==== Korean War ====
The organizational structure of the 187th Airborne Regimental Combat Team included a Pathfinder Team; however, when the 187th conducted a parachute assault in October 1950 near the villages of Sukchon and Sunchon in North Korea, the commander, Brig. Gen. Frank S. Bowen, decided against using pathfinders on the jump. According to USAF Historical Study No. 71, "Bowen thought that the use of pathfinder teams to signal for resupply drops would have been valuable, but such teams, had they been employed to mark the initial jump areas, would have been killed before they got into action."

==== Vietnam War ====
In Vietnam Pathfinder Infantrymen were inserted into areas to establish landing zones for air assaults or other helicopter operations. Pathfinders determined the most practical landing zones, withdrawal routes, approach lanes, and landing sites for helicopter assaults, in hostile areas. They themselves would then often be extracted with helicopter McGuire rigs.

The US Army's 11th Aviation Group landed in the country in August 1965, and while assigned to the 1st Cavalry Division (Airmobile) expanded its Pathfinder unit to company size, creating the provisional 11th Pathfinder Company.

While the 11th Pathfinder Company was assigned to the 1st Cavalry Division's reconnaissance section, units such as the 1st Infantry Division, 101st Airborne (Airmobile), 82nd Airborne (3rd Brigade), etc., operated Ranger or Long Range Reconnaissance Patrol (LRRP) companies within their reconnaissance elements.

The 1st Cavalry Division (Airmobile), which had deployed to Southeast Asia in September 1965, departed South Vietnam in April 1971. The 11th Aviation Group re-deployed from Southeast Asia in March 1973.

The activities of the Pathfinder Platoon, HHC, 160th Aviation Group, 101st Airborne Division in Vietnam are covered in the book "Pathfinder: First In, Last Out" by the late Richard R. Burns, a veteran of the unit. To date it is the only book covering pathfinders in Vietnam.

==== Post–Vietnam Era ====
In the post–Vietnam era the Army established pathfinder units in US-based aviation units, to include the 222d Aviation Battalion in Alaska and the 6th Cavalry Brigade (Air Combat) at Fort Hood, TX.

The Army also activated pathfinder units in both the Army Reserve and the National Guard. The first USAR unit was the 26th Infantry Platoon in Wichita, KS, which was formed with the lineage of a former Regular Army scout dog unit that had served in World War II and Korea. This was followed by the 27th Infantry Platoon in Grand Prairie, TX, which had no prior history, and the 5th Infantry Platoon, which carried the lineage of a former Regular Army pathfinder unit that had been assigned to Fort Rucker, AL, from 1963 to 1975, when it was expanded and reflagged as Company C (Pathfinder), 509th Infantry. In time the 54th Infantry Platoon was activated in Wenatchee, WA, and the 79th Infantry Platoon at Fort Douglas, UT. All were 22-man units with one officer, one NCOIC, an RTO for each, and three six-man teams. These were the USAR platoons, their locations and the commands to which they were assigned:

- 5th Infantry Platoon (Pathfinder), Fort Meade, MD (97th ARCOM; administratively attached to HQ 11th SFGA and later assigned to HQ 31st Aviation Group)
- 26th Infantry Platoon (Pathfinder), Wichita, KS (89th ARCOM)
- 27th Infantry Platoon (Pathfinder), NAS Dallas, Grand Prairie, TX (90th ARCOM)
- 54th Infantry Platoon (Pathfinder), Wenatchee, WA 124th ARCOM)
- 79th Infantry Platoon (Pathfinder), Fort Douglas, UT (96th ARCOM)

The Army National Guard activated five pathfinder detachments. Its 1136th Infantry Detachment was formed using the assets of the Pathfinder Detachment, HQ 36th Airborne Brigade when the brigade was inactivated in April 1980.

- 28th Infantry Detachment (Pathfinder), Fort Indiantown Gap, Annville, PA (28th Inf Div, PA ARNG)
- 76th Infantry Detachment (Pathfinder), Stockton, CA (40th Inf Div, CA ARNG)
- 77th Infantry Detachment (Pathfinder), Columbus, OH (73rd Inf Bde, OH ARNG)
- 667th Infantry Detachment (Pathfinder), Saint Thomas, VI (VI ARNG)
- 1136th Infantry Detachment (Pathfinder), Austin, TX (TX ARNG)

== Modern pathfinders ==
Pathfinders exist in a number of armed forces around the world. Most of them are senior members of parachute units and have earned the right to wear the maroon beret.

=== Belgium ===
Belgium has a platoon of pathfinders that is special operations capable as part of the Special Operations Regiment. They are paracommandos that receive an extra pathfinder course at Schaffen. The Belgian pathfinders keep close ties with their Dutch and British counterparts, with whom they perform joint exercises.

=== Canada ===
Canadian Armed Forces members can complete an 11-week Patrol Pathfinder course, which is one of the most difficult courses in the Canadian military. Patrol Pathfinders are experts at insertion and extraction techniques by air, land, or sea. They are proficient in establishing drop zones, landing zones, beach sites, and tactical airstrips.

=== France ===
Commando Parachute Group (GCP Groupement de Commando Parachutistes): Each regiment within the 11th Parachute Brigade (11^{e} Brigade Parachutiste) trains one or two GCP teams from their own ranks. There are nineteen teams with about a dozen members each in the GCP, which is structured as follows:

- 1st Parachute Chasseur Regiment (1^{er} Régiment de chasseurs parachutistes) (three teams of ten commandos)
- 1st Parachute Hussar Regiment (1^{er} Régiment de hussards parachutistes) (two teams)
- 2nd Foreign Parachute Regiment (2^{e} Régiment étranger de parachutistes) (three teams)
- 3rd Marine Infantry Parachute Regiment (3^{e} Régiment de parachutistes d'infanterie de marine) (two teams)
- 8th Marine Infantry Parachute Regiment (8^{e} Régiment de parachutistes d'infanterie de marine) (two teams)
- 17th Parachute Engineer Regiment (17^{e} Régiment de génie parachutiste) (two teams)
- 35th Artillery Parachute Regiment (35^{e} Régiment d'artillerie parachutiste) (two teams)
- 11th Parachute Command and Transmission Company (11ème Compagnie de Commandement et de Transmissions Parachutiste (11e CCTP))

Not to mention the GCP (one team) of the 2nd Marine Infantry Parachute Regiment (2^{e} Régiment de parachutistes d'infanterie de marine) stationed on Reunion Island in the Indian Ocean.

=== Netherlands ===
The Netherlands have a pathfinders platoon which was founded in 2007. Since the Netherlands did not have a pathfinders unit before that, they were founded on the Belgian model where they receive their pathfinder courses in Schaffen. The Dutch pathfinders platoon maintains close cooperation with their Belgian counterparts, with joint training facilities and exercises.

=== Portugal ===
The Air-Land Pathfinders Company (Companhia de Precursores Aeroterrestres) is a special reconnaissance support unit of the Parachute Troops of the Portuguese Army.

=== South Africa ===
The 44 Pathfinder Platoon is part of 44 Pathfinder Company of the South African Army, within 44 Parachute Brigade and 1 Parachute Battalion respectively.

=== United Kingdom ===
The Pathfinder Platoon is a special reconnaissance and special operations unit of the British Army, and an integral part of 16 Air Assault Brigade. The Pathfinder Platoon acts as the brigade's advance force and reconnaissance force. Its role includes locating and marking drop zones and helicopter landing zones for air landing operations. Once the main force has landed, the platoon provides tactical intelligence for the brigade.

Following the 1982 Falklands War, 5 Airborne Brigade was established as a light, rapid reaction force for similar requirements. The brigade was formed from the Parachute Regiment, and support units. The brigade identified a requirement for an independent intelligence collection capability, deployable into a hostile or non-permissive environment ahead of the main force so in 1985 the Pathfinder Platoon was established.

Pathfinder Platoon operations have included:

- Operation Agricola: In June 1999, the Pathfinder Platoon was deployed to Kosovo. It operated behind enemy lines providing reconnaissance and forward air control. Once NATO forces entered Kosovo, the Platoon provided a defensive screen around Pristina International Airport prior to the arrival of the Russian forces.
- Operation Palliser: In May 2000 the Pathfinder Platoon deployed to Sierra Leone, to assist the United Nations Mission in Sierra Leone efforts.
- Operation Essential Harvest: With the rise in ethnic tension overspilling in to violence in Republic of Macedonia between ethnic Albanian, National Liberation Army (NLA) and Macedonian security forces, the British Government sent a force to oversee a NATO-led ceasefire. The Pathfinders, alongside the UKSF, oversaw the uneasy truce and were used to establish links between the warring factions and monitor any hostile activities.
- Operation Veritas: The platoon deployed into Bagram Air Base, Afghanistan, in December 2001 to assist NATO's International Security Assistance Force.
- Operation Telic: In Iraq, the primary mission for the teams was to conduct mobile surveillance/fighting patrols behind enemy lines in support of UK and US forces. After the hostilities, the unit were redeployed on the Iran/Iraq border as well as carrying out "snatch squad" tasks on suspected Ba'athist war criminals in Maysan.
- Operation Herrick: The Platoon was deployed to the southern Afghan province of Helmand alongside the British 3 Para Battle Group in 2006. They deployed again to Helmand, Afghanistan, in 2010/2011.

The platoon work under the command of the Brigade Headquarters. The Officer Commanding Pathfinder Platoon is a senior captain or major. The platoon operates in teams of 6 men. In 2006 a new rate of Parachute Pay (High Altitude Parachute Pay) was introduced for members of the Pathfinder Platoon following the recommendations of the Armed Forces’ Pay Review Body.

=== United States ===
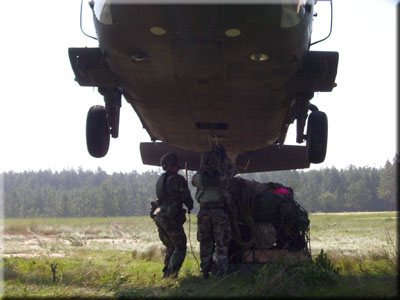
US Army Pathfinders conducting helicopter sling load operations, 2 January 2002

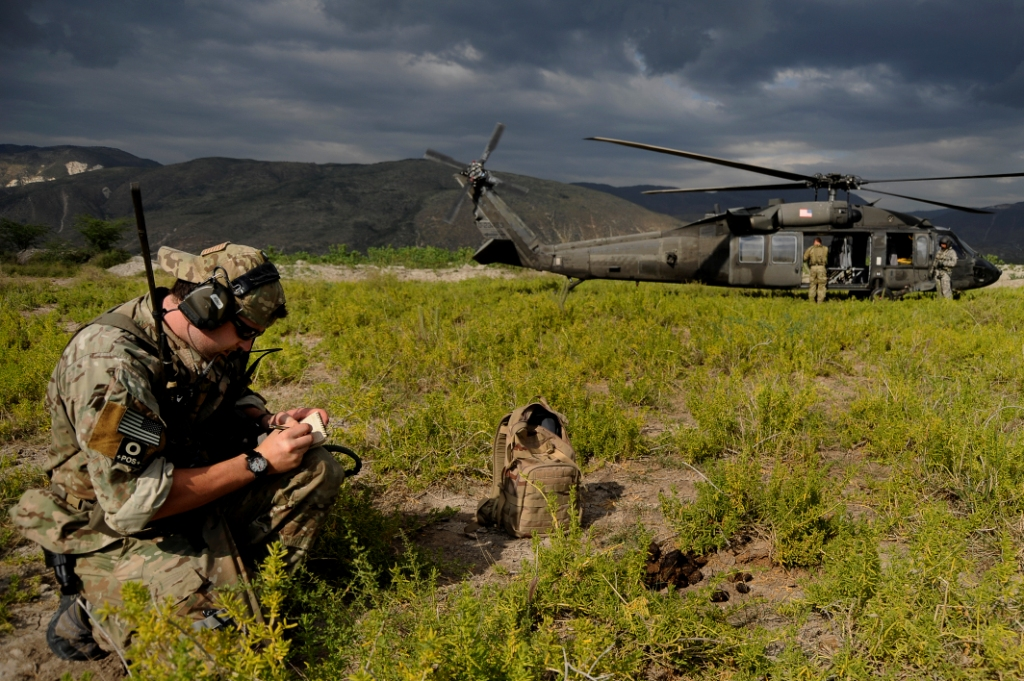
USAF combat controller assesses a potential relief supply air delivery drop zone during Operation Unified Response in Port-au-Prince, Haiti, Jan. 19, 2010.

The U.S. Army operates three Pathfinder schools. The first is the United States Army Pathfinder School, at Fort Benning, Georgia, which serves as the Army proponent agency for Pathfinder operations and oversees the standardization of Army Pathfinder doctrine. The second is the Sabalauski Air Assault School of Fort Campbell, KY. The third is part of Fort Benning's Army National Guard Warrior Training Center, which also conducts Pre-Ranger and Air Assault classes. The courses taught at the WTC and Fort Campbell do not include parachute jumps.

As the airmobile concept was being developed before the Vietnam War, starting about 1960 there was a pathfinder presence at Fort Rucker, Alabama, initially designated as the Pathfinder Team, Company A, 2d Battle Group, 31st Infantry, later re-flagged as the 5th Battle Group, 31st Infantry on 1 July 1963. The purpose of the battle group, which was organized differently than standard battle groups, was to provide training support to the Aviation Center. Subsequent reorganizations and re-flaggings led to the 5th Infantry Detachment (Pathfinder) and 5th Infantry Platoon (Pathfinder). On 1 July 1975 the unit was reorganized and re-flagged as Company C (Pathfinder), 509th Infantry, and it retained this designation until 1 June 1993 when it was re-flagged as Company A (Pathfinder), 511th Infantry. This designation only lasted until 31 October 1995 when the Pathfinder presence at Fort Rucker came to an end due to budget cuts that also ended the post's Air Assault School. Combined with the inactivation of all five USAR pathfinder platoons and all five ARNG Pathfinder detachments at the end of fiscal year 1990, the inactivation of A-511th at Fort Rucker resulted in only two Pathfinder units remaining in the Army: a detachment in the 17th Aviation Brigade in Korea and a company in the 101st Aviation Brigade of the 101st Airborne Division (Air Assault) at Fort Campbell, Kentucky.

In June 2005 the 17th Aviation Brigade in Korea was inactivated, along with its pathfinder detachment. At the time it was the only pathfinder unit outside of the 101st Airborne Division (Air Assault).

When the U.S. Army reorganized its combat divisions under the modular concept, long range surveillance detachments (LRSD) were eliminated at division level. Concurrently in the 101st Airborne Division (Air Assault), the 101st Aviation Brigade (Attack) and the 159th Aviation Brigade (Assault) were reorganized to be identical combat aviation brigades, and the division's former LRSD was transferred from the 311th Military Intelligence Battalion to the 159th CAB to become a second pathfinder company within the division. At this point the two pathfinder companies were (1) Company F (Pathfinder), 4th Battalion, 101st Aviation Regiment, 159th Combat Aviation Brigade and (2) Company F (Pathfinder), 5th Battalion, 101st Aviation Regiment, 101st Combat Aviation Brigade.

In 2006 the LRSD, 313th Military Intelligence Battalion in the 82nd Airborne Division at Fort Bragg was likewise transferred to the 2d Battalion, 82d Aviation Regiment, and reorganized and reflagged as Company F (Pathfinder).

Also formed up were two provisional pathfinder units not documented on the parent units’ MTOE. These were Company F, 2d Battalion, 10th Aviation Regiment, part of the Combat Aviation Brigade, 10th Mountain Division (Light Infantry) at Fort Drum, NY, and a pathfinder company operating as part of the 2d Battalion, 25th Aviation Regiment, Combat Aviation Brigade, 25th Infantry Division, Schofield Barracks, HI. These pathfinder units filled roles across the spectrum of their doctrinal missions, along with other roles outside of their prescribed task lists.

An Army News Service article dated 10 September 2014 noted the activation of a new company within the 1st Battalion, 509th Infantry Regiment at Fort Polk, Louisiana. This unit, Company C, was described as "a rifle company with pathfinder capabilities."

Jump status for the two pathfinder companies in the 101st was terminated on 16 October 2013, resulting in the elimination of the last parachute billets in the division. This was followed on 15 May 2015 by the inactivation of the 159th CAB, which included the brigade's pathfinder company. Concurrently the 101st CAB was redesignated as the CAB, 101st Airborne Division, bringing it in line with other non-numbered divisional CABs. At this point the division assumed the same organizational structure as the 10th Mountain Division, a light infantry unit.

On 2 August 2016 the remaining pathfinder company in the 101st Airborne Division was inactivated in a ceremony at Fort Campbell, KY. Media accounts erred in stating that “seventy-two years of service came to an end” with the inactivation of the company. The World War II pathfinder units were assigned at the infantry regiment level, not division level, and the division itself was inactivated in late 1945. Reactivated three times in the post-war years as a non-combat training division without pathfinders, the division was reformed again as a combat unit in 1956. Documentation on when pathfinders returned to the division is sparse, but most likely took place in the 1960s with the advent of helicopter warfare and the shift of the pathfinder mission from control of fixed-wing aircraft, which had gone to USAF combat control teams, to Army rotary wing aircraft. When the 101st Airborne Division stood down in Vietnam in early 1972, soldiers with time remaining on their tours, to include pathfinders, were reassigned to other units, such as the 3d Brigade, 1st Cavalry Division (Separate), and the division flag returned to Fort Campbell.

In the summer of 2016 the provisional pathfinder company in the 25th Infantry Division was inactivated, followed by the inactivation of the company in the 101st Airborne Division (above), and the provisional company in the 10th Mountain Division by October 2016. The last pathfinder unit in the Army, a company authorized by MTOE in the 82d Airborne Division, was inactivated in a ceremony at 1400 on 24 February 2017 at Simmons Army Airfield on Fort Bragg.

In July 2020 the Army announced that it was considering terminating its Pathfinder course at Fort Benning, Georgia, by the end of the Fiscal Year 2021, and it later decided to do so. By the end of 2021 the website for the Airborne & Ranger Training Brigade no longer listed the Pathfinder course among its offerings. The website for the ARNG Warrior Training Center, also based at Fort Benning, showed no class dates past the end of FY 2021. The Sabalauski Air Assault School at Fort Campbell, Kentucky, under the 101st Airborne Division (Air Assault), continues to operate its own Pathfinder course.

Pathfinders in the U.S. Army wear the Pathfinder Badge.

== In popular culture ==
- Pathfinders (1972–1973, aka The Pathfinders) is an ITV drama set in the Second World War, telling the story of the fictitious Royal Air Force 192 Pathfinder squadron.
- Pathfinders – In the Company of Strangers is 2011 movie based on Rebecca/Eureka transponding radar installed before D-Day by Airborne Pathfinders.

== See also ==
- Filthy Thirteen
- List of paratrooper forces
