= 517th Parachute Infantry Regiment =

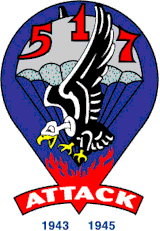
- Shoulder sleeve insignia of the 517th Parachute Infantry Regiment.
- Active: 1943–1946
- Country: United States
- Branch: United States Army
- Type: Airborne forces
- Role: Parachute infantry
- Size: Regiment
- Part of: 17th Airborne Division; 82nd Airborne Division; 13th Airborne Division
- Motto: "Attack"
- Engagements: Italian Campaign; Operation Dragoon; Battle of the Bulge

Commanders
- Notable commanders: Rupert D. Graves

Insignia
- The 517th PIR's Airborne Background Trimming of WWII

- The 517th PIR's Airborne Background Trimming post WWII

The 517th Parachute Infantry Regiment (517th PIR) was an airborne infantry regiment of the United States Army, formed during World War II. At times the regiment was attached to the 17th Airborne Division, 82nd Airborne Division and later, the 13th Airborne Division. During most of their combat, the unit was an independent combined force of 17th Airborne troops called the 517th Parachute Regimental Combat Team or 517th PRCT /517th PCT /517th RCT.

The unit was formed in early 1943 and trained at Camp Toccoa, Georgia. The 517th saw heavy fighting in the Italian Campaign in June 1944, before being transferred to take part in Operation Dragoon in August 1944, in Southern France, which happened to be their first combat jump. Following the liberation of France, the 517th was attached to the 82nd Airborne Division and fought with it in Belgium, during the Battle of the Bulge. Following the end of the war, the 517th was assigned to Fort Bragg, North Carolina, where the unit was inactivated on 25 February 1946.

== Operation Dragoon ==
The 517th was one of three parachute infantry regiments assigned to the First Airborne Task Force, which was charged with the assault on Southern France. The assault was set for 0800 on 15 August 1944, however, the 517th dropped early at 0328 on the 15th. This marked the unit's first combat jump. After three days of heavy fighting around the towns of Le Muy, Les Arcs, La Motte and Draguignan, German resistance ceased. For their participation in Operation Dragoon and the subsequent liberation of France, the 517th PIR was awarded the French Croix de Guerre by the Provisional Government of the French Republic.

== Battle of the Bulge ==
The 517th was attached to the XVIII Airborne Corps following the liberation of France, along with the 82nd, 101st, and 13th Airborne Divisions. Elements of the 517th participated in counter-attacks near the Belgian towns of Soy, Sur-Les-Hys, Hotton, and Manhay, pushing the German offensive past its starting point. The 517th suffered heavy casualties in the ferocious fighting during the battle, during which 1st Battalion, 517th received the Presidential Unit Citation for its successful assault on Soy and Hotton.

== Last days of World War II ==
Following the Battle of the Bulge, the 517th PIR was assigned to the 13th Airborne Division, to take part in Operation Varsity, the airborne crossing of the Rhine river. However, prior to the operation, the 13th's participation in the attack was called off. The 517th, then attached to the 17th Airborne Division, was slated to take part in Operation Coronet, the airborne invasion of the Japanese Home Islands, which was also called off after V-J Day.

== Statistics ==
The 517th Parachute Regimental Combat Team accumulated over 150 combat days during five campaigns on battlefields in Italy, France, Belgium and Germany.

The battalion casualty rate was 81.9 percent. The team suffered 1,576 casualties and had 247 men killed in action.

PFC Melvin E. Biddle B/1/517th PIR was awarded the Medal of Honor for heroic actions during the Soy-Hotton engagement.

On 15 February 1945, elements of the RCT were assigned to the 13th Airborne Division. The 13th was inactivated in February 1946.

In addition to the one Medal of Honor, troopers of the 517th PRCT earned 6 Distinguished Service Crosses, 131 Silver Stars, 631 Bronze Stars, 1,576 Purple Hearts, 5 Legion of Merits, 4 Soldier's Medals, 2 Air Medals and 17 French Croix de Guerres.

== Notable soldiers ==
- Richard J. "Dick" Seitz, led the 2nd Battalion. He later went on to become a Lt. General, commanding Fort Bragg, the 82nd Airborne Division, and the XVIII Airborne Corps.
- Melvin Zais, commanded the 3rd Battalion and then became executive officer for the Regimental Combat Team. He went on to become Commanding General of the U.S. Third Army.
- Melvin E. Biddle, B Company, Medal of Honor recipient.
- George W. Dunaway became the 2nd Sergeant Major of the Army from 1968 to 1970, the highest ranking enlisted man in the Army.
- David E. Grange, Jr., Commanding General, Sixth U.S. Army
- Terry Sanford, an FBI agent, joined the 517th. He later became state legislator, lawyer, author of several books, Governor of North Carolina, U.S. senator, Duke University president, and two-time presidential candidate.
