= 550th Airborne Infantry Battalion (United States) =

The 550th Airborne Infantry Battalion was an independent airborne forces formation of battalion-size of the United States Army formed during World War II on 1 July 1941 at Fort Kobbe Panama Canal Zone. The 550th was originally formed as an air landing unit rather than a parachute or glider battalion.

The battalion's mission was to land if required in Central, Latin, and South American countries as well as areas in the Caribbean, notably Martinique. The unit would be preceded by the 551st Parachute Infantry Battalion.

As the threats to the Caribbean and Latin American regions subsided in 1943, the 550th was redesignated the 550th Glider Infantry Battalion under the command of Lt. Colonel Edward Sachs and undertook glider training in Sicily. The unit was assigned, along with other Allied airborne units, to the 1st Airborne Task Force and participated in Operation Dragoon, the Allied invasion of Southern France, on 15 August 1944 where the 550th captured the town of Le Muy.

The 550th Airborne was sent to Aldbourne, England in November 1944 after the 1st Airborne Task Force was disbanded. During the Battle of the Bulge in late December 1944 the 550th was attached to the 194th Glider Infantry Regiment, part of the 17th Airborne Division. In February 1945 the 550th was consolidated into the 3rd Battalion of the 193rd Glider Infantry Regiment.

Both the 193rd Glider Infantry Regiment and the 550th were disbanded in Belgium on 1 March 1945.

== Campaign streamers ==
- Rome-Arno
- Southern France (with arrowhead)
- Ardennes-Alsace
- Rhineland
