= 460th Parachute Field Artillery Battalion (United States) =

460th Parachute Field Artillery
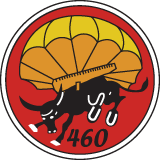
- Shoulder Sleeve Insignia of the 460th Parachute Field Artillery Battalion.
- Active: 1943–1945
- Country: United States
- Branch: United States Army
- Type: Airborne forces
- Role: Parachute field artillery
- Part of: 517th Parachute Regimental Combat Team; 13th Airborne Division
- Engagements: Italian Campaign; Operation Dragoon; Battle of the Bulge

The 460th Parachute Field Artillery Battalion (460th PFAB) was an airborne field artillery battalion of the United States Army that saw active service during World War II. Active from 1943–1946, the battalion trained with the 17th Airborne Division; served with the 517th Parachute Regimental Combat Team in the Italian Campaign, Operation Dragoon, and the Battle of the Bulge; and ended the war assigned to the 13th Airborne Division before inactivation.

== History ==
The 460th PFAB was formed at Camp Toccoa, Georgia, under the command of Lieutenant Colonel James B. Anderson and utilizing cadre from the 377th PFAB. After training at Camp Toccoa and Camp Mackall, North Carolina, the battalion conducted jump training at Fort Benning, Georgia, completing its fifth training jump on 18 September 1943. Further training at Camp Mackall culminated in training maneuvers in Tennessee in January–February 1944, where the battalion participated in the "annihilation" of the 26th "Yankee" Division during a 64-mile forced march with its supported infantry.
Returning to Camp Mackall, the battalion was relieved from the 17th Airborne Division and attached to the 517th Parachute Infantry Regiment to form the 517th Parachute Regimental Combat Team (PRCT). In early May 1944, Lieutenant Colonel Anderson and his staff were relieved, replaced by Lieutenant Colonel Raymond L. Cato and officers selected from the 466th PFAB. During this short period before deployment, Lieutenant Colonel Cato ordered Battery D, originally organized as an anti-tank and anti-aircraft unit with 37mm guns and .50 caliber machine guns, converted to a fourth 75mm pack howitzer battery. After final preparations at Camp Patrick Henry, Virginia, the battalion departed Hampton Roads, Virginia on 17 May 1944, aboard the USS "Cristobal".
Arriving in Naples, Italy, on 31 May 1944, the 460th staged at "The Crater" outside the city for two weeks, waiting the arrival of the unit's equipment. After moving north aboard an LST to Civitavecchia, the 460th entered combat, supporting the 36th Infantry Division's attacks toward Follonica for 12 days. Throughout July 1944, the battalion staged at Frascati, near Rome. While preparing for the invasion of southern France, the Paratroopers were also able to relax with passes to Rome, the establishment of an NCO club, and other amusements. Some non-jumpers were also qualified at the Airborne Training Center south of Rome.
On 12 August 1944, the battalion (less Battery C, which staged with the 1st Battalion, 517th Parachute Infantry near Canino and assaulted with 1/517 in Serial 9) staged at the Montalto Air Field for two days, before departing for France in the Serial 8. On 15 August 1944, the 460th conducted its first combat parachute assault, landing in southern France. A third of the battalion (15 plane loads) landed near the intended drop zone. Lieutenant Colonel Cato led the assembly of this group, which had four howitzers in operation by 0630 hours, and an additional two by 0800 hours. Captain Louis Vogel of Battery C assembled most of his battery and two guns near Trans-en-Provence, northwest of the drop zone and dragged the howitzers by hand back toward the assembly area. A third group, about 40–60 men from Batteries A, B and D, jumped early and landed near Frejus, France, nearly 20 miles from the intended drop zone. Consolidating under Major Edward Frank, the battalion executive officer, "Task Force Frank" neutralized an 88mm position and routed an enemy battalion on their way to the assembly area. "Task Force Frank" finally arrived at the battalion's assembly area, with four howitzers. On the evening of 15 August 1944, the battalion received the gliders of the 602nd Glider FA Battalion, doubling the artillery support to the infantry. Over the next 90 days, the 460th accompanied the 517th as it pursued the Germans north and east into the Alps, continuously providing direct support to the infantry and firing 9,130 rounds. After relief in the line, the battalion was assigned to XVIII Airborne Corps and moved from La Colle, near Nice, to Soissons in northern France by train, arriving on 9–10 December 1944.

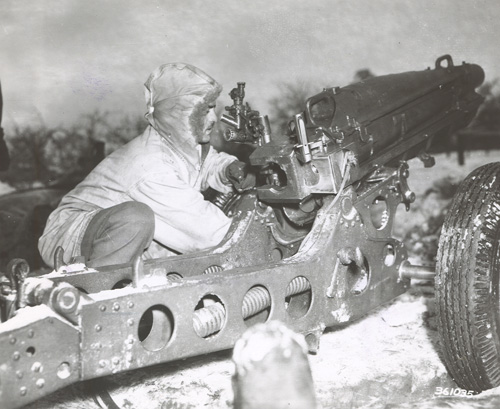
Corporal Tony D'addio of Battery D, 460th Parachute Field Artillery Battalion labors to sight in a 75mm pack howitzer outside Logbierme, Belgium.

== Notable members ==
- Raymond L. Cato, 460th PFAB Commander, 15 April 1944 - January 1946
- Joe David Brown, journalist and author of Paper Moon and Kings Go Forth, served in Battery D.

== 460th PFAB Killed in Action ==
- Private Marion L. Adams, Battery C
- Private First Class Robert W. Brown, Battery A
- Private Moffet C. Cook, Battery C
- Private First Class Richard R. Daley, Battery B
- Private Richard E. Donnelly, Battery B
- Private First Class Philip M. Kennamer, Battery C
- Private First Class Billie E. Lewis, Battery C
- 2nd Lieutenant Harry F. Moore, Battery C
- Private Melvin R. Palmer, Battery D
- 2nd Lieutenant Duane L. Smith, Battery B
- Private Charles H. Tatro, Battery C
- Captain Robert P. Woodhull, HQ Battery

== 460th PFAB Silver Stars ==
- Corporal James Bain
- Private First Class Richard E. Donnely
- Technician Fourth Class Robert Lyon
- 1st Lieutenant Thomas W. Mehler
- 2nd Lieutenant Duane L. Smith
- Captain Sylvester G. Weller

== Lineage and honors ==
=== Lineage ===
- Constituted 14 April 1943 in the Army of the United States as the 460th Parachute Field Artillery Battalion and activated at Camp Toccoa, Georgia
- Assigned ## August 1943 to the 17th Airborne Division
- Relieved 6 May 1944 from the 17th Airborne Division
- Assigned ## February 1944 to the 13th Airborne Division
- Inactivated

incomplete & unofficial; extracted from the 13th Airborne Division yearbook

=== Campaign participation credit ===
World War II: Rome-Arno; Southern France (with arrowhead); Rhineland; Ardennes-Alsace; Central Europe

=== Decorations ===
- French Croix de Guerre
- Belgian Croix de Guerre

== See also ==
- 13th Airborne Division
- 517th Parachute Regimental Combat Team
- 517th Parachute Infantry Regiment
