= 551st Parachute Infantry Battalion (United States) =

1st Battalion, 551st Parachute Infantry Regiment 551st Parachute Infantry Battalion
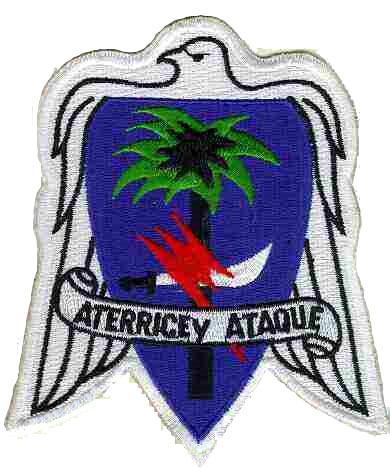
- Shoulder sleeve patch of the GOYA
- Active: 26 November 1942 – 27 January 1945
- Disbanded: 27 January 1945—absorbed into 82nd Airborne Division
- Country: United States
- Branch: United States Army
- Type: Parachute infantry
- Role: Airborne forces
- Size: Battalion
- Part of: 1st Airborne Task Force
- Garrison/HQ: Fort Kobbe, Panama and Camp Mackall, North Carolina
- Nickname: GOYA (Get Off Your Ass)
- Mottos: Aterrice y Ataque; Land and Attack
- Mascot: Furlough
- Engagements: World War II: Italian Campaign; Operation Dragoon; Battle of the Bulge Folded Into The 82nd Airborne Division at the end of the battle; Western Allied invasion of Germany
- Decorations: Presidential Unit Citation

Commanders
- Notable commanders: Lt. Col. Wood G. Joerg

The 551st Parachute Infantry Battalion (551st PIB) was, for many years, a little-recognized airborne forces unit of the United States Army, raised during World War II, that fought in the Battle of the Bulge. Originally commissioned to take the French Caribbean island of Martinique, they were shipped instead to Western Europe. With an initial strength of 800 officers and enlisted men, the remaining 250 members of the battalion were ordered on 7 January 1945 to attack the Belgian village of Rochelinval over open ground and without artillery support. During the successful assault the unit lost more than half its remaining men. The battalion was inactivated on 27 January 1945 and the remaining 110 survivors were absorbed into the 82nd Airborne Division. Virtually nothing of the unit's history was known to the American public until the 1990s when renewed interest prompted its veterans to seek recognition for their costly success at Rochelinval. The battalion was awarded a Presidential Unit Citation in 2001 recognizing its accomplishment.

== Combat operations ==
- Italian Campaign
- Operation Dragoon, with Arrowhead
- Battle of the Bulge

== Activation and training ==
The 1st Battalion, 551st Parachute Infantry Regiment was activated on 26 November 1942 at Fort Kobbe in the Panama Canal Zone. Its initial cadre came from Company C of the 501st Parachute Infantry Battalion, while the rest of that battalion was absorbed into the 503rd Parachute Infantry Regiment. Its first draft of new men was gathered in the Frying Pan Area of Fort Benning, Georgia, on 30 October 1942. Those personnel were trained as paratroopers through the Parachute School Replacement Pool in November–December 1942. Leaving Fort Benning on 11 December, they passed through Richmond and staged at Camp Patrick Henry, near Newport News, Virginia, arriving there on 13 December. While at Camp Patrick Henry, the men picked up a unique mascot, a short-haired black and tan dachshund puppy they stole from the yard of the port commander. They named her Furlough, which was the thing the men most desired. Under strict orders of secrecy, they could not wear their hard-won airborne insignia and were prohibited from leaving the base.

=== Prepared to take Martinique ===
Upon arrival in Panama, they trained for approximately eight months in jungle warfare to prepare for a planned invasion of the Vichy French island of Martinique. On 13 May 1943, the battalion was put on alert for a possible drop on Martinique. The island was being utilized as a re-supply base for German U-boat submarines in the Caribbean Sea. The battalion's presence in Panama had been kept secret until around that time, when they were part of a special review in Balboa, Panama for the president of Colombia. Publicizing their presence at this point was part of an effort to put psychological pressure on the Vichy administration in Martinique. Before the mission could be initiated, the island government joined the Free French in 1943, and the invasion was canceled.

The battalion left Panama in August 1943. En route, the ship's crew discovered the dog, and the ship's Master-at-Arms ordered the dog thrown overboard. Lieutenant Colonel Wood Joerg, the Battalion's commanding officer, earned a great deal of his men's loyalty and fierce respect when he successfully faced down the Master, risking a court-martial, and the crew was able to keep their mascot. They arrived at Camp Mackall, North Carolina, the same month. The 551st Parachute Infantry Regiment never gained regimental strength and was re-designated as the 551st Parachute Infantry Battalion.

=== Origin of their nickname ===
One of Colonel Joerg's favorite expressions was "Get off your ass!”. Given the Army's penchant for acronyms, soon the men were referring to themselves as "GOYA birds", or simply GOYAs.

=== Return to the United States ===
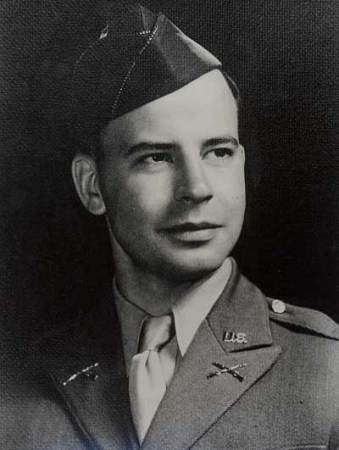
Lieutenant Colonel Wood G. Joerg, the popular commanding officer of the 551st Parachute Infantry Battalion. He was killed during the unit's assault on Rochelinval on 7 January 1945.

On 20 August 1943, the battalion along with their sister unit, the 550th Airborne Infantry Battalion was sent to Camp Mackall, North Carolina for additional training. Lieutenant Colonel Rupert D. Graves replaced Lieutenant Colonel Wood Joerg in October 1943. This including training in night jumping on 16 February 1944. While at Camp Mackall the battalion was assigned to the Airborne Command. The unit underwent intense training and was selected to participate in testing the feasibility of using gliders as paratroop transport. The battalion received a personnel commendation from Major General Elbridge Chapman, commander of Airborne Command.

During training in North Carolina, the 551st PIB were the first American paratroopers to jump out of military gliders. The experiment was a failure as there was no slipstream leading the men to fall straight, and the glider's flimsy construction led to the anchor line cable ripping out of the inside when the men jumped.

In March 1944, Lieutenant Colonel Joerg rejoined the unit, and on 23 April 1944, the Battalion departed Norfolk, Virginia for Italy. Transiting through Oran, North Africa, the battalion arrived in Naples on 23 May 1944. They trained at Camp Wright in Trapani and Marsala, Sicily during June 1944, before moving to Lido di Roma, near Rome in July. The 551st was attached to six different American units during World War II.

== Combat in southern France ==
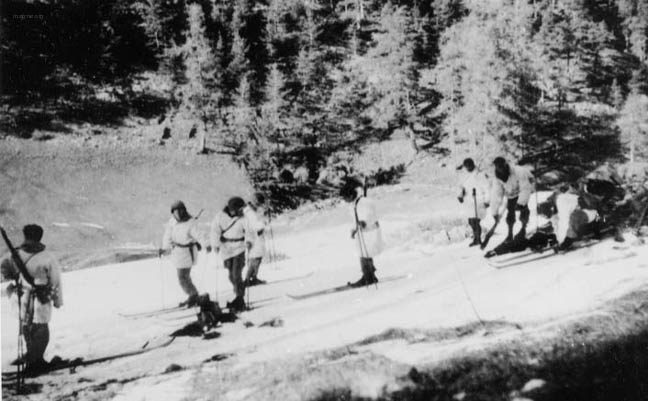
Members of the 551st Parachute Infantry Regiment on patrol in the French Alps during World War II.

As a non-divisional unit for the entire war, the battalion was attached to the provisional 1st Airborne Task Force for the Allied invasion of southern France in August 1944. On 15 August 1944, the 551st finally got into the war with their first combat jump during Operation Dragoon. They liberated Draguignan, France on 15 August 1944 and on 29 August, they liberated Nice.

From 15 August 1944 through 17 November 1944, the 551st, along with the 509th Parachute Infantry Battalion and the 550th Airborne Infantry Battalion, protected the right flank of the U.S. Seventh Army in the French-Italian Alps as mountain troops against the Austrian 5th Gebirgsjaeger Division. On 22 November 1944 the Battalion was attached to the U.S. 101st Airborne Division. The battalion then moved to Laon in northern France on 8 December 1944, and on 19 December 1944 were suddenly summoned to help stem the Ardennes offensive.

== The Battle of the Bulge ==
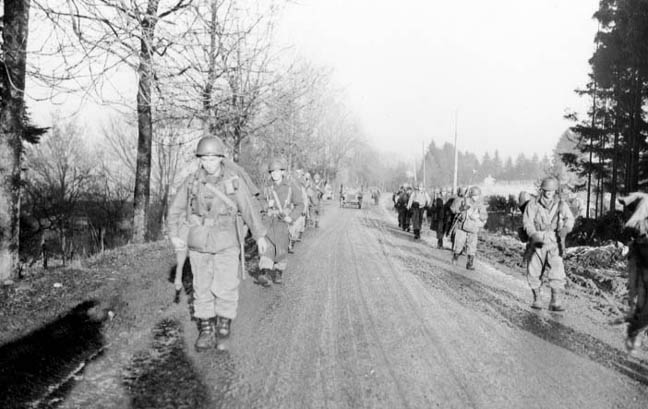
Men of the 551st Parachute Infantry Battalion moving up to the line of battle early in the Battle of the Bulge, before the weather turned, 22 December 1944.

On 21 December the 551st Parachute Infantry Battalion was reassigned to the U.S. 30th Infantry Division reinforcing their positions in and around Rahier, Stoumont, La Gleize, Francorchamps, Ster and Stavelot, Belgium. The 551st Parachute Infantry Battalion arrived in Werbomont, Belgium and entered the Battle of the Bulge on 21 December 1944 with a strength of more than 643 officers and enlisted men. The 551st were the initial spearhead in U.S. XVIII Airborne Corps's counter-offensive on the northern shoulder of the Bulge. Their first days in the Battle of the Bulge were, according to paratrooper Don Garrigues, miserable: "no sleep, frozen feet, trench foot, knee deep snow, cold food and hallucinations." He had a vivid memory of that Christmas Eve:

The attack had been canceled and we were to move back to an area near Ster. Along with my buddies, I went into one of the houses. Some troopers from another outfit had managed to get some "C" rations and had built a fire under a tub of water in the fireplace of one of the buildings. They offered to share with us so I picked one of the cans out of the hot water. Eating the warm food by the fire and thinking of the mission that had been cancelled, I felt that I had been given one of the best Christmas presents ever.

On 26 December, they reported near Basse-Bodeux to the 508th Parachute Infantry Regiment, part of the U.S. 82nd Airborne Division. They received a visit from Major General James Gavin, commanding general of the 82nd Airborne, who visited their bivouac at Rahier on 27 December. He told the battalion that it had been chosen to make the initial "raid in force" against the Germans. He told them they would be the unit who was going to turn the battle around. He stressed that they might take very heavy casualties but that a great deal depended on the outcome. Their task was to pass through the U.S. Army's forward lines, cross about 4 miles (6.4 km) into German-held territory, and attack and reduce the German-held village of Noirefontaine. They were then to return to base with prisoners for interrogation.

The evening of the next day they carried out the raid against the Oberst Friederich Kittel's 62nd Volksgrenadier Division in the tiny hamlet of Noirefontaine, taking 18 casualties in the process. They faced Kittel's stubborn troops again. From 3–8 January 1945, they assaulted the small hamlets of Mont-de-Fosse, St. Jacques, and Dairomont. According to the unit's Presidential Unit Citation, "On 4 January, the battalion conducted a rare fixed bayonet attack of machine gun nests that killed 64 Germans." Fighting through the thick woods cost the 551st heavy casualties. On the morning of 7 January, down to only 250 men, they were next charged with taking the village of Rochelinval, Belgium, along the Salm River.

The defending 183rd Volksgrenadier Regiment was backed up by a regiment of 88mm guns and a battalion of 105 mm howitzers. Colonel Joerg had requested preparatory artillery which was not forthcoming. He requested that the attack be delayed, and his request was denied. He thought the attack, down slope by his un-camouflaged men in the daylight across a half-mile expanse of foot-deep snow at a concealed, alert enemy, to be suicidal. Their only cover would be their 81 mm mortars. Paratrooper Don Garrigues wrote:

The riflemen charged out of the woods, down the sloping area and across the cleared field. The Germans were fully awake by that time and had taken positions behind a rock fence. They seemed to have a sizable force, including several machine guns and automatic weapons. Several of our riflemen fell from the hail of enemy bullets. I was firing point blank at a German machine gun and our tracers were crossing. Pascal from Company A was lying beside me feeding the ammunition belt into the machine gun. Soon a burst of bullets tore into his arm and shoulder. He yelled, "I’m hit!" and managed to crawl toward a depressed area behind us while I kept firing. A short time later I felt a jolt like getting hit on the shoulder with a ball bat. At first I thought that was it and then I felt the burning pain and blood. I instinctively yelled "Medic!" and began crawling and pulling myself toward the depression or ditch behind me. It wasn’t long before a medic came to where I was lying and gave me a shot of morphine.

While victorious in capturing Rochelinval and eliminating the last German bridgehead for over 10 miles (16 km) on the Salm River, the unit was virtually eliminated, having suffered more than 85% casualties. Relieved on 9 January 1945, of the 643 men who entered the battle on 3 January, only 14 officers and 96 men remained. "Nowhere were casualties higher than in Wood Joerg's 551st Battalion." Like the independent 509th Infantry Battalion, the unit's strength had been overwhelmed by battle, and paratrooper replacements were not in the pipeline.

== Disbandment ==
On 27 January 1945, in Juslenville, Belgium, General James M. Gavin informed the remaining men that the battalion was being inactivated and all remaining soldiers would be absorbed into the 82nd Airborne Division. The unit records were absorbed into the 82nd Airborne and virtually lost for many years, their sacrifice unknown to many.

== Casualties ==
Because the unit was disbanded and its remaining men absorbed into various units, U.S. Army records on the number of casualties are conflicting.

KIA: 66, WIA: (TBD); NBC: (TBD)

== Citations ==
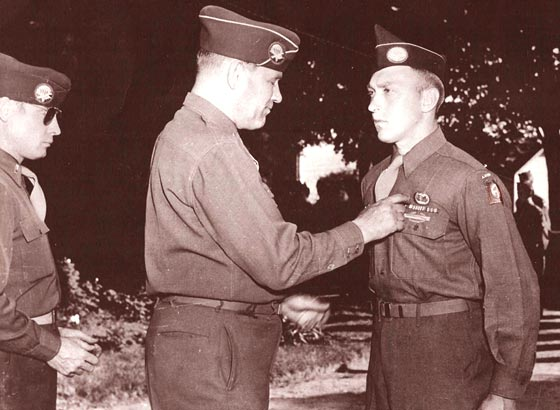
Brigadier General Francis A. March presents Private Milo Huempfner, 551st Parachute Infantry Regiment, with the Distinguished Service Cross in June 1945 for his action during the Battle of the Bulge.

DSC: (2); Silver Star: (1); Bronze Star: (1)

Army Chief of Staff Gen. Eric K. Shinseki awarded the Presidential Unit Citation for extraordinary heroism during the Battle of the Bulge to the unit during an official ceremony at the Pentagon on 23 February 2001.

By virtue of the authority vested in me as President of the United States and as Commander in Chief of the Armed Forces of the United States, I have today awarded THE PRESIDENTIAL UNIT CITATION (ARMY) FOR EXTRAORDINARY HEROISM TO THE 551st Parachute Infantry Battalion. The 551st Parachute Infantry Battalion is cited for exceptional heroism in performance of duty in combat against the enemy at the beginning of the American counteroffensive in the Ardennes, Belgium, culminating in its heroic attack and seizure of the critical, heavily fortified, regimental German position of Rochelinval on the Salm River. A separate battalion attached to the 82nd Airborne Division, the 551st began its grueling days as the Division's spearhead by successfully executing a raid on advanced German positions at Noirfontaine on 27 and 28 December1944, delivering to XVIII Airborne Corps vital intelligence for the Allied counteroffensive soon to come. On 3 January 1945, the 551st from the division's line of departure at Basse Bodeux attacked against great odds and secured the imposing ridge of Herispehe. Punished by artillery, mortar and machine gun fire as it moved across open, up slope terrain, the battalion lost its forward artillery observers, causing an acute lack of artillery support for its week-long push against two German regiments. On 4 January, the battalion conducted a rare fixed bayonet attack of machine gun nests that killed 64 Germans. On 5 and 6 January, the 551st captured the towns of Dairomont and Quartiers, parrying German counterattacks while often fighting in hand-to-hand combat. At less than half strength, on 7 January the battalion confronted its final critical objective: Rochelinval on the Salm River. Initially repelled into a hailstorm of artillery and machine gun fire toward a high ridge of entrenched enemy, the 551st finally overwhelmed the defenders and captured Rochelinval, shutting off the last bridge of egress to the Germans in a 10-mile sector of the Salm River. The next day, 8 January, Hitler ordered the German Army's first pullback from the Battle of the Bulge. In fighting a numerically superior foe with dominant high ground advantage, the 551st lost over four-fifths of its men, including the death of its inspirational commander, Lieutenant Colonel Wood Joerg, as he led the last attack. Disbanded a month later, the battalion accounted for 400 German dead, and took over 300 prisoners. The 551st Parachute Infantry Battalion fought with a tenacity and fervor that was extraordinary. In what United States Army historian Charles MacDonald called "the greatest battle ever fought by the United States Army," the 551st demonstrated the very best of the Army tradition of performance of duty in spite of great sacrifice and against all odds.

== Cultural legacy ==
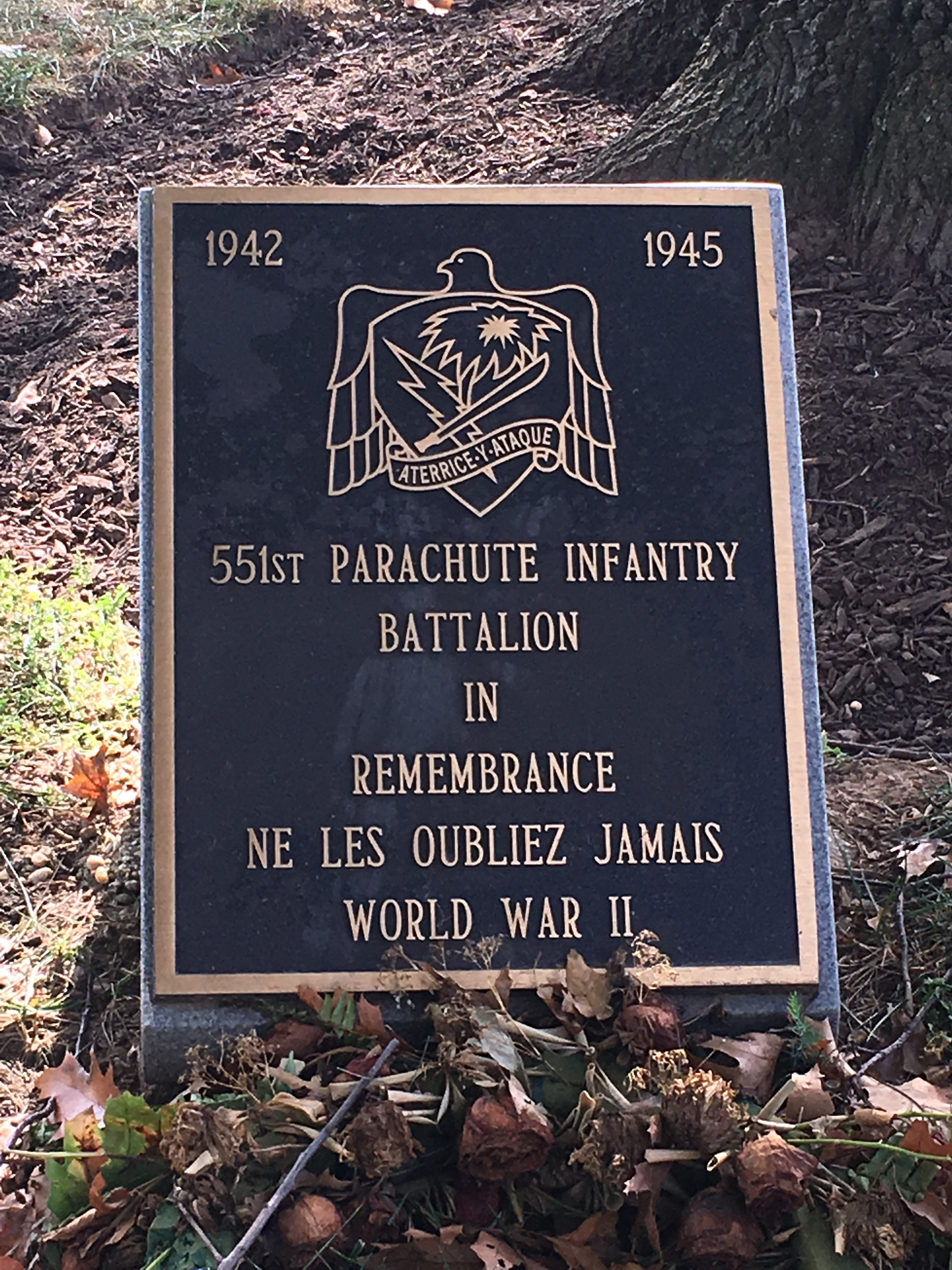
In Arlington National Cemetery, Virginia, USA; a memorial plaque to the battalion.

Many WWII momentos and memorabilia including uniforms, helmets, equipment are on display at December 44 Museum, at La Gleize, Belgium. It includes the unit commander Lt. Col. Wood G. Joerg's signature beret (killed on 7 January 1945 at Rochelinval)

A monument was built at Leignon, Belgium, to memorialize Pfc Milo Huempfner, who was awarded the Distinguished Service Cross for action there on 23 December 1944.

A plaque was dedicated in Noirefontaine, Belgium to the 551st Parachute Infantry Battalion and the civilians of the area.

A plaque dedicated in La Chapelle, Belgium in the town hall to the 551st Parachute Infantry Regiment.

A memorial stone was placed at Fort Benning, Georgia, honoring the battalion. It is notable because it includes a statue of their dog mascot, Furlough.

In Rochelinval, Belgium a plaque was dedicated on 20 August 1989 to the 551st Parachute Infantry Battalion from the Belgian people. A Stele to Lt. Col. Wood G. Joerg who was killed on 7 January 1945, and to the 551st Parachute Battalion Combat Team. On 18 February 2001, a plaque was added to the stele with the Presidential Unit Citation. In February 2000, a plaque was dedicated to Bill Tucker, "Tucker's House," and to his I Company, 505th Parachute Regiment. In 2010 another plaque was added in memory of Sgt. Robert H. Hill, who was killed on 7 January 1945 in Rochelinval. For his heroïc actions on that day he was awarded the DSC.

In the SandHill Game land on the west side of Camp Mackall, NC a monument was dedicated (1 JULY 1992) to the heroic men of the 551st PIB. This monument is also dedicated to the memory of the 8 Paratroopers that drowned in Lake Kinney Cameron Lake during a night jump on 16 FEBRUARY 1944.

There is a monument located next to the house that served as former medical aidstation at Dairomont. This monument is dedicated to the 551st and their legendary bayonet charge at German machinegun positions in the woods nearby the monument.

The G.I. Joe character Dusty displayed a patch on his left sleeve that implied he had been a part of 551st Parachute Infantry battalion before being assigned to the G.I. Joe task force.
