= Noirefontaine =

- Commune
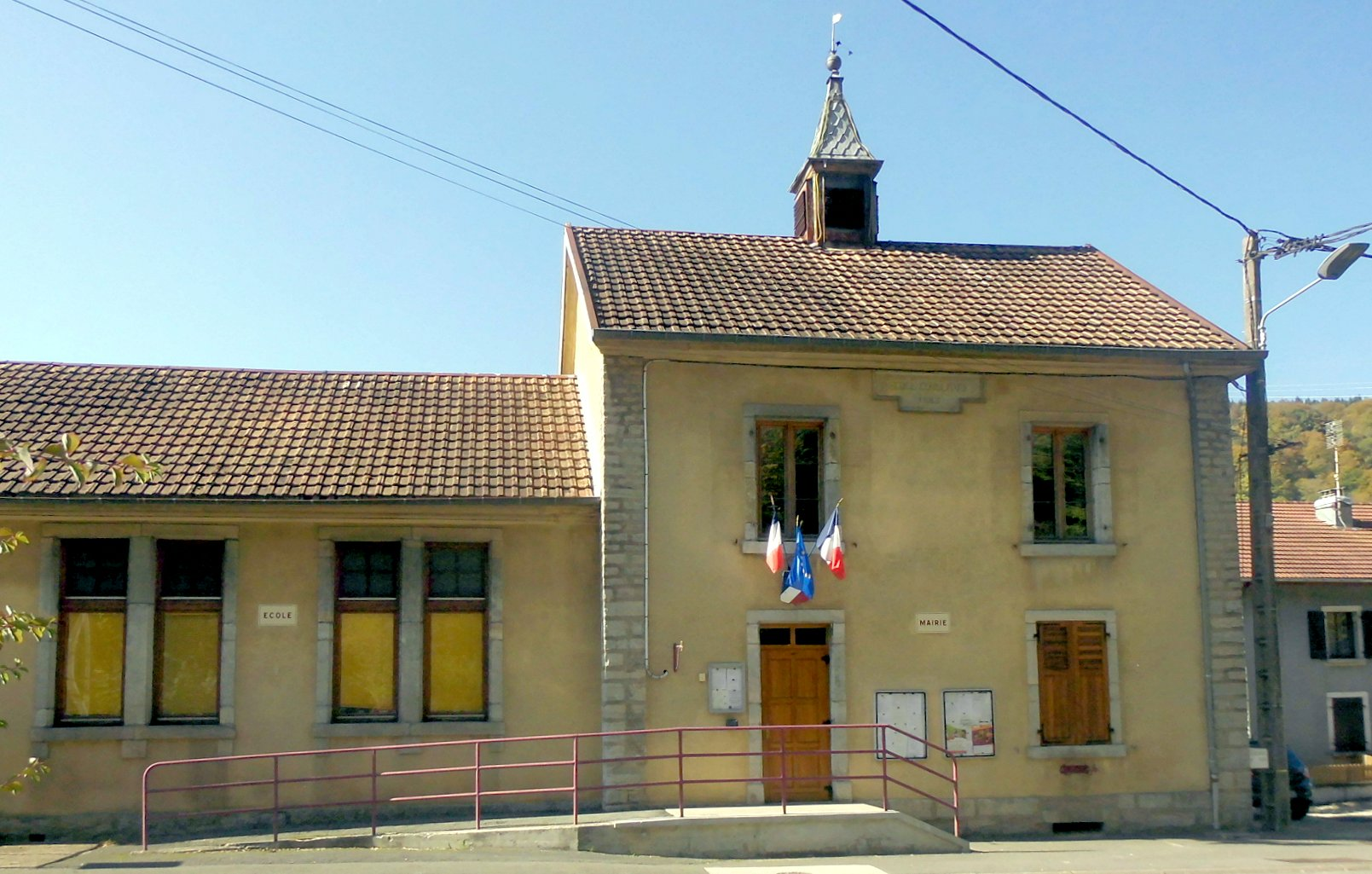
- The town hall in Noirefontaine

- Coat of arms
- Location of Noirefontaine
- Location within France Location within Bourgogne-Franche-Comté
- Coordinates: 47°20′59″N 6°45′46″E
- Country: France
- Region: Bourgogne-Franche-Comté
- Department: Doubs
- Arrondissement: Montbéliard
- Canton: Valentigney
- Intercommunality: Pays de Montbéliard Agglomération

Government
  - Mayor (2020–2026): Marie-Line Lebrun
- Area^{1}: 3.35 km^{2} (1.29 sq mi)
- Highest elevation: 630 m (2,070 ft)
- Lowest elevation: 350 m (1,150 ft)
- Population (2023): 324
  - Density: 96.7/km^{2} (250/sq mi)
- Time zone: UTC+01:00 (CET)
  - Summer (DST): UTC+02:00 (CEST)
- INSEE/Postal code: 25426 /25190
- ^{1} French Land Register data, which excludes lakes, ponds, glaciers > 1 km^{2} (0.386 sq mi or 247 acres) and river estuaries.

Noirefontaine (French pronunciation: [nwaʁfɔ̃tɛn]) is a commune in the Doubs department in the Bourgogne-Franche-Comté region in eastern France.

== Geography ==
The commune lies 4 km (2.5 mi) south of Pont-de-Roide between the Doubs and the Lomont on a major highway.

== Population ==
Historical population
Year	Pop.	±% p.a.
1968	252	—
1975	292	+2.13%
1982	416	+5.19%
1990	404	−0.37%
1999	384	−0.56%
2007	360	−0.80%
2012	375	+0.82%
2017	359	−0.87%
2023	324	−1.70%
Source: INSEE

== See also ==
- Communes of the Doubs department
