= Salm (Amblève) =

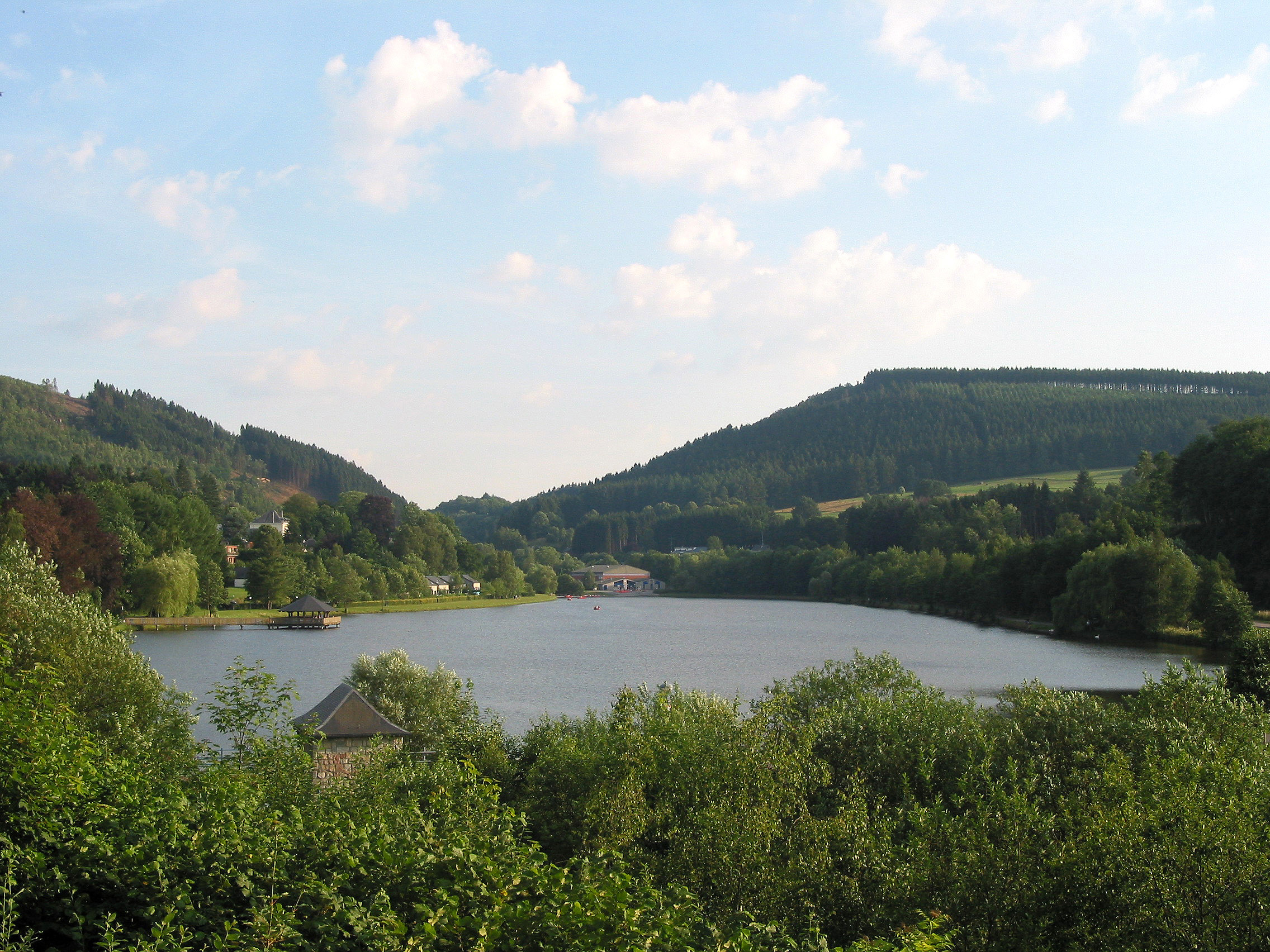

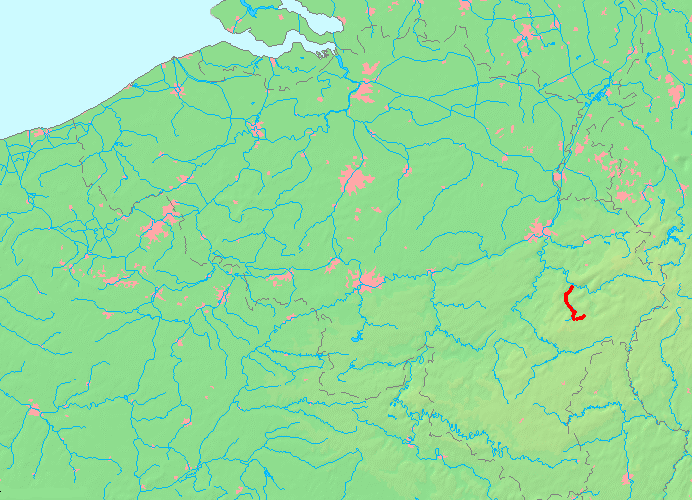

Location
- Country: Belgium

Physical characteristics
- Mouth: Amblève
  - coordinates: 50.3760°N 5.8727°E

Basin features
- Progression: Amblève→ Ourthe→ Meuse→ North Sea

The Salm (French pronunciation: [salm]) is a river in eastern Belgium (provinces of Liège and Luxembourg), left tributary to the river Amblève. Its source is in the Ardennes, close to the border with Luxembourg near Bovigny. The Salm flows through the municipalities Gouvy, Vielsalm and Trois-Ponts, where it joins the river Amblève. It was also fought over in World War II. The 106th Golden Lions Division of the United States Army held the river until overrun by the Germans. Some of the men ran into the river to get away from the Germans and made it across successfully.
