= Le Muy =

Le Muy Lo Muei (Occitan)
- Commune
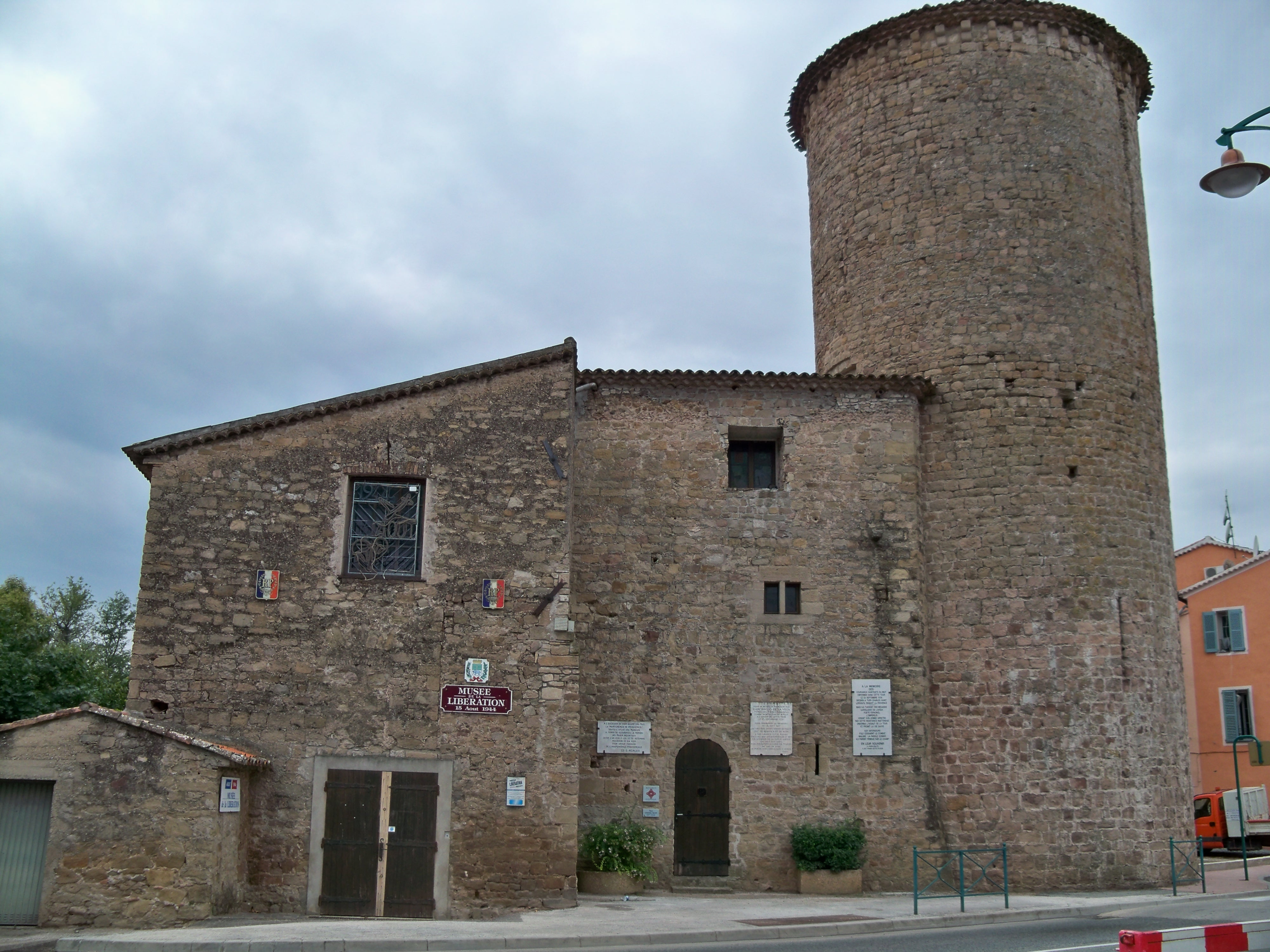
- The Charles Quint Tower, an historic monument which contains the Liberation Museum.

- Coat of arms
- Location of Le Muy
- Location within France Location within Provence-Alpes-Côte d'Azur
- Coordinates: 43°28′25″N 6°34′00″E
- Country: France
- Region: Provence-Alpes-Côte d'Azur
- Department: Var
- Arrondissement: Draguignan
- Canton: Vidauban
- Intercommunality: CA Dracénie Provence Verdon

Government
  - Mayor (2020–2026): Liliane Boyer
- Area^{1}: 66.58 km^{2} (25.71 sq mi)
- Elevation: 30 m (98 ft)
- Highest elevation: 561 m (1,841 ft)
- Lowest elevation: 7 m (23 ft)
- Population (2023): 10,118
  - Density: 152.0/km^{2} (393.6/sq mi)
- Time zone: UTC+01:00 (CET)
  - Summer (DST): UTC+02:00 (CEST)
- INSEE/Postal code: 83086 /83490
- ^{1} French Land Register data, which excludes lakes, ponds, glaciers > 1 km^{2} (0.386 sq mi or 247 acres) and river estuaries.

Le Muy (French pronunciation: [lə mɥi]; Occitan: Lo Muei) is a commune in Var, a department in the Provence-Alpes-Côte d'Azur region in southeastern France.

Le Muy was one of the first places to be liberated in the Allied invasion of Southern France in August 1944. It lies to the southeast of Draguignan and north-northwest of Saint-Tropez.

== Population ==
Historical population
Year	Pop.	±% p.a.
1968	3,820	—
1975	4,280	+1.64%
1982	5,442	+3.49%
1990	7,248	+3.65%
1999	7,826	+0.86%
2007	8,716	+1.36%
2012	9,327	+1.36%
2017	9,134	−0.42%
2023	10,118	+1.72%
Source: INSEE

== See also ==
- Communes of the Var department
