= Fort William Henry Harrison =

Montana National Guard's training facility near Helena, Montana

Coordinates: 46°37′25″N 112°05′50″W

- Interactive map of Fort William Henry Harrison
- Location: Lewis and Clark County, Montana, USA
- Nearest city: Helena, Montana

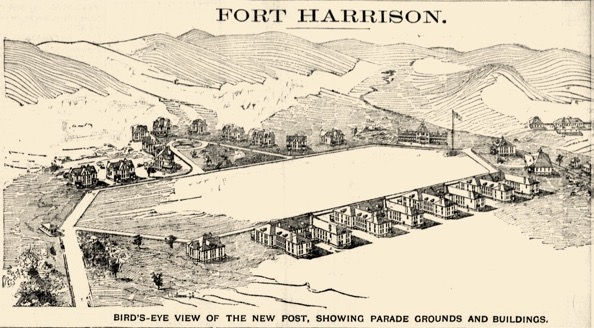
Fort William Henry Harrison, 1894

Fort William Henry Harrison is the Montana National Guard’s training facility, located near Helena, Montana. It is also home to the Fort Harrison VA Medical Center and Montana State Veterans Cemetery, located adjacent to the military installation.

== History ==
Fort William Henry Harrison (1895–1913) was authorized by a Congressional act of 12 May 1892 which was intended to establish, as a part of a greater consolidation program, concentrations of troops in a few larger installations so that smaller installations could be abandoned. The post was first named Fort Harrison after the sitting President of the United States, Benjamin Harrison, on 13 December 1892. Some years later on 16 February 1906, the name was changed to Fort William Henry Harrison because it was discovered that there had already been an Army fort named for Benjamin Harrison in Indianapolis, Indiana. Fort William Henry Harrison was first garrisoned with troops from Fort Assinniboine near Havre, Montana 23 September 1895. These initial troops were withdrawn in 1913.

Fort William Henry Harrison's most famous contribution during the 20th century was its 1942 use as the organization and training area for the U. S. Army's 1st Special Service Force, a joint World War II American-Canadian light infantry brigade made famous by the 1966 book, The Devil's Brigade, co-written by Robert H. Adleman and George Walton, and The Devil's Brigade, the 1968 American war film.

=== Current operations ===
The post is now home of the Montana National Guard's Joint Forces Headquarters, 95th Troop Command, 208th Regional Training Institute, Training Center Headquarters, 190th Chemical Reconnaissance Detachment, Montana Medical Readiness Detachment, 83rd Civil Support Team, 1049th Fire Fighting Detachment, and I Company 145th Forward Support Element. Additionally, there is as an Army Reserve training facility and Veterans Affairs Hospital.

== See also ==
- List of military installations in Montana
