= First Special Service Force =

Joint U.S.-Canadian military unit in WWII

1st Special Service Force
- 1st Special Service Force shoulder patch
- Active: 9 July 1942 – 5 December 1944
- Country: United States; Canada
- Allegiance: Allies (United Nations)
- Branch: Army
- Type: Commando
- Role: Special operations
- Size: 1,800
- Garrison/HQ: Fort William Henry Harrison
- Nicknames: The Devil's Brigade, The Black Devils
- Equipment: See: Training and Equipment

Commanders
- Notable commanders: Robert T. Frederick

The 1st Special Service Force (FSSF) was an elite joint American–Canadian commando unit in World War II, formed by Lieutenant Colonel Robert T. Frederick of the Operations Division of the U.S. General Staff. During the Italian campaign of World War II, it was commanded by Frederick and attached to the United States Fifth Army. In August 1944, the Force was attached to 1st Airborne Task Force (commanded by then Major General Frederick) for the campaign in southern France.

The unit was organized in 1942 and trained at Fort William Henry Harrison near Helena, Montana, in the United States. The Force served in the Aleutian Islands, fought in Italy and southern France, and was disbanded in December 1944.

The modern American and Canadian special operations forces trace their heritage to this unit. In 2013, the United States Congress passed a bill to award the 1st Special Service Force the Congressional Gold Medal.

== Origins and development ==
=== Background ===
Geoffrey Pyke was an English journalist, educationalist, and later an inventor whose clever, but unorthodox, ideas could be difficult to implement. In lifestyle and appearance, he fit the common stereotype of a scientist-engineer-inventor: in British slang, a "boffin". This was part of the British approach to encouraging innovative warfare methods and weapons during World War II, which was personally backed by Prime Minister Winston Churchill. Hobart's Funnies is another example.

While working for the British Combined Operations Command, Pyke devised a plan for the creation of a small, elite force capable of fighting behind enemy lines in winter conditions. This was to have been a commando unit that could be landed, by sea or air, in occupied Norway, Romania, or the Italian Alps for sabotage missions against hydroelectric plants and oil fields.

In Norway, the chief industrial threat was the production of the heavy water used in the German atomic weapon research at Rjukan. Furthermore, attacks on 14 designated Norwegian hydroelectrical power stations, those which would be vulnerable to special force snow vehicles, which supplied the country with 49% of its total power, might drive the Axis powers out of the country and give the Allies a direct link to the USSR. In Romania, there were the strategically important Ploiești oil fields that met one quarter of German consumption, and Italian hydroelectric plants powered most of south German industry. Pyke requested that a tracked vehicle be developed especially for the Norwegian operations, capable of carrying men and their equipment at high speed across snow-covered terrain.

=== Project Plough ===
In March 1942 Pyke proposed Project Plough to Lord Louis Mountbatten, Chief of Combined Operations Headquarters. Pyke suggested that Allied commandos be parachuted into the Norwegian mountains to establish a covert base on the Jostedalsbreen, a large glacier plateau in German-occupied Norway, for guerrilla actions against the German army of occupation. Equipped with Pyke's proposed snow vehicle, they would attack strategic targets, such as 14 important hydroelectric power plants. Pyke persuaded Mountbatten that such a force would be virtually invulnerable in its glacier strongholds and would tie down large numbers of German troops trying to dislodge it.

However, given the demands upon both Combined Operations and British industry, Britain instead offered Plough to the United States at the Chequers Conference of March 1942. General George Marshall, Chief of Staff of the United States Army, accepted Plough. In April 1942, since no suitable vehicle existed, the US government asked automobile manufacturers to look into such a design. With input from an international team that included Canadian inventor George J. Klein, Studebaker subsequently created the T-15 cargo carrier, which later became the M29 Weasel.

In May 1942, Plough was reviewed by Major Robert T. Frederick, a young officer in the Operations Division of the U.S. General Staff. Frederick predicted Plough would be a military fiasco. Firstly, he argued that Plough called for unrealistic objectives with the number of troops allocated. Similarly, he argued that the small, elite unit would be outnumbered and overwhelmed trying to hold a captured area. Furthermore, Frederick concluded that there was no definite way to evacuate the troops after a mission. Withdrawal would require significant troop lift and covering fighter support. All vehicles and equipment would have to be abandoned. Finally, Plough had called for troops to be parachuted on their targets, which Frederick said was impossible at the moment because there were no planes to fly the men into Norway. Additionally, significant aircraft would be necessary to drop the Weasels and resupply the force. Ultimately, he concluded that a small unit of elite men would not do enough damage to justify the risk of putting them into battle. He instead proposed a series of strategic bombings to achieve the plan's objectives.

Generals Marshall and Eisenhower had already discussed Plough with the British high command and were unwilling to give up a chance to open an American front in Europe. It was believed that Plough offered the possibility of defeating the Germans, and the Americans wanted Allied efforts to shift to the Pacific Theater. The sooner the Germans were defeated, it was argued, the sooner this would become a reality.

The first officer picked to lead the unit, Lieutenant Colonel Howard R. Johnson, did not get along well with Pyke. Johnson was transferred after arguing with Mountbatten and Eisenhower about the feasibility of the plan. (Johnson went on to form and command the 501st Parachute Infantry Regiment.) He was replaced by Frederick, following a suggestion by Mountbatten, which was approved by Eisenhower. Frederick was given the task of creating a fighting unit for Plough and was promoted to colonel to command it. By July 1942 Frederick had eased Pyke out of the picture.

The First Special Service Force (FSSF) was activated on 9 July 1942 as a joint Canadian-U.S. force of three small regiments and a service battalion, directly answerable to the joint Chiefs of Staff. US Army Fort William Henry Harrison in Helena, Montana, was chosen as the primary training location, due to its flat terrain for airborne training and its close proximity to mountains for ski and winter training.

Frederick had very high priority in obtaining equipment and training areas. Originally, due to its winter warfare mission, it had been intended that the FSSF should be equally made up of American, Canadian, and Norwegian troops. However, a lack of suitable Norwegians saw this changed to half American and half Canadian.

=== Canadian recruitment ===
In July 1942, the Canadian Minister of National Defence, James Ralston, approved the assignment of 697 officers and enlisted men for Plough, under the guise that they were forming Canada's first airborne unit, the 1st Canadian Parachute Battalion (1CPB).

Due to a decision to raise an actual Canadian parachute battalion, the Canadian volunteers for Plough were also sometimes known unofficially as the "2nd Canadian Parachute Battalion". (The Canadians did not officially become a unit until April–May 1943, under the designation, 1st Canadian Special Service Battalion.)

While its members remained part of the Canadian Army, subject to its code of discipline and paid by the Canadian government, they were to be supplied with uniforms, equipment, food, shelter and travel expenses by the US Army. It was agreed that a Canadian would serve as second in command of the force and that half of the officers and initially one-half of the enlisted men would be Canadian. This resulted in a total force of 1,800 men: 900 US soldiers and 900 Canadian soldiers. As casualties depleted the Force, restrictions on the availability of Canadian replacements reduced the proportion of the Canadian contingent to about one-third of the total. After Lieutenant Colonel McQueen, the senior Canadian member, broke his leg during parachute training, the highest ranking Canadian in the force was Lieutenant Colonel Don Williamson, who commanded the 2nd Regiment.

=== US recruitment ===
The US volunteers for the force consisted initially of officers from Forts Belvoir and Benning.

Letters of recruitment were posted to all US Army units in the Southwest and on the Pacific coast. The letters called for single men, aged 21–35 with three or more years of high school. Occupations preferred: Rangers, lumberjacks, north woodsmen, hunters, prospectors, explorers, and game wardens. Married men were not accepted for the Force. Inspection teams also scoured the western camps for ideal candidates. Those chosen, due to the secrecy of the mission, were often told that they had been selected to undergo training for a parachute unit. Indeed, the unit was so secretive, that many soldiers did not know where they were when they arrived in Helena for training, as the windows of the trains carrying the troops were painted black.

The combat force was to be made up of three regiments. Each regiment was led by a lieutenant colonel and 32 officers and had 385 men. The regiments were divided into two battalions with three companies in each battalion and three platoons in each company. Each platoon had two sections.

Following initial training period in Montana, the FSSF relocated to Camp Bradford, Virginia, on 15 April 1943, and to Fort Ethan Allen, Vermont, on 23 May 1943.

=== Training and equipment ===
Because the unit needed to be trained quickly, the soldiers began parachuting within 48 hours of their arrival in Helena, Montana. The camp had no training towers and preliminary flights were not carried out, so for many this was their first experience at jumping. This training was completed before any other because it was believed that if all the soldiers earned their jumping badges simultaneously a sense of camaraderie would develop within the camp.

The men were on a strict and physically demanding three phase training schedule: 1) From August to October: parachuting, weapons, and demolitions usage, small unit tactics and physical training. 2) From October to November: unit tactics and problem solving. 3) From November to July: skiing, rock climbing, adaptation to cold climates and operation of the M29 Weasel.

The training schedule started with reveille at 04:30 from Monday to Saturday followed by breakfast at 06:30. The obstacle course was run by 08:00 four times a week, followed by the day's training, which differed depending on the month. Soldiers were expected to march double time between training exercises to adhere to the strict schedule. Training lectures were given by veterans of overseas wars in the evenings from Monday to Friday. Soldiers were given Saturday evenings and Sundays off. Most of the men went into Helena to relax on their days off.

Marches were done on a 60-mile (97 km) course. The course record was set by the 1st Regiment of Colonel A. C. Marshall, which completed it in twenty hours. The FSSF trained with enemy weapons, taking them apart, reassembling and shooting them until they were as proficient with them as with their own.

The hand-to-hand combat instructor was Dermot (Pat) O'Neill, an ex-Shanghai International Police Officer, who was an expert at unarmed combat. O'Neill, who was well-versed in several forms of martial arts, taught the men to attack the eyes, throat, groin, and knees. He also taught knife fighting tactics and showed the men how to quick-draw their pistols. The men attacked one another with unsheathed bayonets as part of the training exercises and injuries were common.

Ski training, taught by Norwegian instructors, began in December. The men received lectures and demonstrations on skiing techniques and most had mastered the basics in two weeks. At this point the men were made to ski cross-country in formation from dawn until dusk with all of their equipment until they were up to Norwegian army standards.

As a light infantry unit destined for mountain warfare or winter warfare, the FSSF was issued various items of non-standard clothing, equipment and rations, including skis, parkas, haversacks and the mountain rations. From the outset, the FSSF was armed with a variety of non-standard or limited-issue weapons, such as the M1941 Johnson light machine gun. The Johnson light machine gun in particular helped greatly increase the firepower of the FSSF and was highly regarded by those who used it in combat. The men were also trained meticulously in the assembly and operation of German weapons in the event that it became necessary to utilize captured German machine guns on the battlefield. This training would later prove to be of crucial importance at Monte Majo.

Frederick's staff even considered arming the men with blow darts, but it was decided against on the grounds that it may have been considered a war crime. Frederick himself participated in the design of a fighting knife made exclusively for the FSSF called the V-42 combat knife, a derivative of the Fairbairn–Sykes fighting knife.

=== Name, insignia and uniforms ===
Legend has it that while carrying out beachhead operations at Anzio, a member of the FSSF found the journal of a German lieutenant from the Hermann Goering Division. The journal contained the following entry: "The Black Devils are all around us every time we come into the line. We never hear them come." This legend was never verified as fact by any member of the FSSF; however, the FSSF was known as the Black Devils and as the Devil's Brigade. The members of the FSSF preferred the latter. General Frederick had cards printed up with the FSSF insignia and the words Das dicke Ende kommt noch! or "The worst is yet to come" printed in red ink down the right side to be left on the bodies of dead Germans as a form of psychological warfare. This was so effective that Sergeant Victor Kaisner reported hearing a German soldier whisper "Schwarzer Teufel" ("Black Devil") as the German's throat was being sliced on the beachhead. However, recent historiography surrounding the FSSF debates whether or not Frederick and his general staff made up the nickname in order to instill fear in the enemy.

The FSSF was unofficially first known as the "Braves". Their spearhead shoulder insignia was chosen with this name in mind. The formation patch was a red spearhead with the words USA written horizontally and CANADA written vertically. The branch of service insignia was the crossed arrows formerly worn by the United States Army Indian Scouts. The FSSF wore red, white, and blue piping on their garrison caps, and on the breast an oval (or trimming) behind their Parachutist Wings. Members of the FSSF also wore a red, white, and blue fourragère, lanyard, or shoulder cord made out of parachute suspension lines.

American members of the FSSF arrived for training in Helena in standard U.S. Army attire: green twill coveralls, some wearing khaki pants and fatigue hats. Others were dressed in trousers and green uniform jackets and wore green caps. Ultimately, however, the American uniforms did not differ widely from one another. The Canadian troops, however, arrived in all different manners of uniform: some wore kilts, others tartan trousers (trews), and others Bermuda shorts. Headgear differed just as widely, depending on where the soldier was from – wedge caps for some, black berets for troops taken from armoured regiments and large khaki Tam o' Shanters for soldiers from Scottish regiments. Under the Williamson-Wickham agreement, Canadian soldiers were issued and wore American uniforms. Eventually, it was decided that the uniforms would come from an American supplier and olive drab trousers and blouses were issued. Two uniform elements differentiated an American from a Canadian: the collar insignia had either "U.S." or "Canada" above the crossed arrows; and Americans wore American metal ID tags and Canadians wore Canadian ID discs. Frederick instructed Major Orville Baldwin to develop a unique fourragère (also known as an aiguillette or lanyard) for all members of the unit, thereby replacing the regimental fourragère worn by the Canadian soldiers. The result was a braided fourragère made with red, white and blue parachute cord. For mountain warfare, the men were given baggy ski pants, parkas, and a helmet. Standard boots were originally the same as those issued to parachuting regiments, but these were replaced with infantry combat boots in Italy.

Colonel Frederick worried from the outset that the soldiers from both countries would have trouble forming a cohesive unit. On a base level, the techniques and commands used by either army were confusing to the other. Commands for marching, for example, had to be homogenized in order for the unit to operate in the field effectively. In order to satisfy the men from both countries, compromises were made. Canadian bagpipers were put into American unit marching bands to play "Reveille" every morning. The marching styles and commands of the American and Canadian armies were mixed and uniforms were made identical. In the end, Frederick's fears were unfounded as the men bonded through training and dedication to the force.

== Assignments and battles ==
In February 1943, Norwegian SOE agents destroyed the heavy water and deuterium plants in Norway, a mission for which the FSSF had been created.

=== Aleutian Islands, 1943 ===
To prevent the FSSF from being disbanded, Frederick proposed using it against the Japanese in Alaska. It was decided that the FSSF would be used against Japanese forces occupying islands off Alaska. The FSSF arrived at the San Francisco Port of Embarkation on 4 July 1943.

On 10 July the Devil's Brigade sailed for the Aleutian Islands off Alaska. On 15 August 1943, the FSSF was part of the invasion of the island of Kiska. The Japanese had evacuated the island, so the FSSF re-embarked. They returned to Fort Ethan Allen, arriving 9 September 1943.

=== Italy deployment, 1943 ===
In October 1943, US Fifth Army commander Lieutenant General Mark W. Clark brought the FSSF to the Italian front. There the FSSF demonstrated the value of its unique skills and training. The FSSF arrived at Naples on 17 November 1943, and immediately went into the line with the US 36th Infantry Division.

=== Monte la Difensa, 1943 ===
The FSSF was tasked with taking two heavily fortified German positions on the Camino ridge in the Italian mountains: Monte La Difensa, overlooking the Volturno River, and Monte La Remetanea, 1,200 yards to the west. These positions were held by the 104th Panzer Grenadier Regiment (an infantry formation) with the 1st Fallschirm-Panzer Division Hermann Göring (an armored division) in reserve. The German positions on La Difensa and La Remetanea were the last entrenched line before the Gustav Line. An Allied push through the mountains would advance closer to Rome. Strategically, the mountains provided a commanding view of the countryside and highway, giving German artillery on the mountain control of the surrounding area. The German artillery atop La Difensa were also using a new weapon - the Nebelwerfer. Previous large scale Allied attacks on the mountain had met the enemy head on and been repelled with disastrous casualties. The paths leading up La Difensa were heavily scouted by the FSSF before their attack. The scouts reported to Lt. Col. T. C. MacWilliam (who would lead the 2nd Regiment's assault on La Remetanea) that the best way to approach the entrenched enemy was up an almost vertical escarpment over the right of the hill mass. By this approach, the FSSF hoped to catch the Germans off guard.

The assault was planned for 2 December. The men were trained in mountain climbing and fighting tactics at their temporary barracks at Santa Maria. The plan was as follows (all battalions were in the 2nd Regiment): At 16:30 hours on 1 December, 2nd Regiment would be trucked to within 6 miles (9.7 km) of the base of La Difensa and march the rest of the way (6-hour march). 1st Regiment, coupled with US 36th Infantry Division would be the reserve units for the 2nd Regiment. 3rd Regiment would be split in two, half to support the 2nd Regiment following the initial assault, and half to be reserves with the 1st Regiment and 36th Infantry Division. All identification on FSSF soldiers was to be removed except their dog tags.

After reaching the base of the mountain and having had a single night's rest, 2nd Regiment (600 men total) began their ascent of La Difensa on 2 December at dusk under cover of a heavy artillery barrage. One soldier recalls the severity of the shelling: "It looked as if we were marching into Hell. The whole mountain was being shelled and the whole mountain seemed to be on fire."

The soldiers of the 2nd Regiment came within range of the German positions at midnight and began to climb the final cliff, which jutted steeply upwards for 1,000 feet (300 m). The men climbed with ropes tied to one another in the freezing rain. Upon reaching the top, MacWilliam signaled his men to move forward into a depression in front of the German entrenchment. Initially, the soldiers were given the order to hold their fire until 6 AM, but the Germans noticed the Allied movement after some FSSF men tripped over loose gravel while moving along the mountaintop. Germans shot flares into the air and the battle began. Through gun and mortar fire, the men of the 2nd Regiment managed to set up machine guns and return fire, surprising and overwhelming the Germans. The 5th Army Staff had guessed that the battle would last between 4–5 days, but within two hours, the Germans on La Difensa had retreated to La Remetanea.

When informed by General Eisenhower that the FSSF had taken Monte la Difensa, Prime Minister Winston Churchill exclaimed that Frederick was "the greatest fighting general of all time".

Previously, American and British forces had suffered many casualties in futile attempts to take the important Camino ridge. The 1st SSF took its initial objective of La Difensa, but the attack on Monte La Remetanea (Hill 907) was halted after the death of 1st Battalion CO Lt. Col. T. C. MacWilliam. While Frederick wanted the attack to continue, he ordered a halt in the advance on 907 to wait for reinforcements and supplies. The FSSF dug in at Difensa, anticipating a German counterattack.

However, massive Allied artillery barrages and the flooding of both the Rapido and Garigliano rivers prevented the Germans from reforming. While waiting for the orders to attack Remetanea, the 2nd Regiment was resupplied by the 1st and 3rd Regiments, who brought them whiskey and condoms (to keep the barrels of their guns dry in the rain). Once the British forces broke through the German lines at Monte Camino, the FSSF was ordered to attack their primary objective (Hill 907).

The successful assault on Difensa was the basis for the 1968 motion picture titled The Devil's Brigade.

During the Monte la Difensa campaign the 1st SSF units engaged suffered 77% casualties: 511 total, 91 dead, 9 missing, 313 wounded with 116 exhaustion cases. They were relieved by the 142nd Infantry. The Force had been reduced numerically to about 1,400 men due to the casualties at Monte la Difensa and Monte Vischiataro.

=== Monte Majo, 1944 ===
The 1st SSF immediately continued its attack, assaulting Monte La Remetanea from 6 to 9 December. It captured Hill 720, starting from Monte Sammucro on 25 December, and after difficulties assaulted Monte Majo and Monte Vischiataro almost simultaneously on 8 January 1944.

The attack on Monte Majo would sustain the highest casualties of the Force in any battle. While the main German positions were located on the summit of Monte Majo, the heights of the mountain were guarded and surrounded by layers of German artillery and machine gun pits located on the approaching slopes. Lt. Col. Tom Gilday of 2nd Regiment planned a preliminary night action to clear an assault route through this defensive shield. Tommy Prince was ordered to lead a scout patrol and accomplish this mission with complete silence during the night. Prince, an expert in stealth combat, proceeded to a point near the lower slopes where he left his men behind as a support group. He then single-handedly approached and entered the gun emplacements. Prince eliminated the enemy gun platoons in the bunkers blocking the projected assault route one after another, beginning with the gun pits on the lower slopes and then proceeding with the middle slopes, without arousing any defensive alarms from the German positions. Prince then returned with his patrol to the Force forward outposts to give his report to Capt. Radcliffe.

The main attack led by Capt. Mark Radcliffe immediately followed Prince's action. Radcliffe's men passed by the then silent machine gun and artillery bunkers and reached the summit without firing a single bullet, the Germans taken by total surprise. The Monte Majo positions were secured by 05:30.

However, following the loss of the summit to the Force, the Germans almost immediately launched large scale counter-attacks to attempt to recapture it, which persisted throughout several days of fierce fighting. The Force made use of heavy machine guns left behind by the retreating Germans to help repel these counter-attacks.

Following the intensive defensive action at Monte Majo, the size of the Force had been reduced from the initial 1,800 men at the start of the mountain campaign to only 400 men still fit for combat. Frederick himself was wounded three times at Monte Majo.

At the conclusion of the Monte Majo operation, Frederick was promoted to Brigadier General. He was awarded the Distinguished Service Cross for his actions and leadership at Monte Majo from 10-13 January, 1944. Prince could not be awarded for neutralizing the German defenses without revealing classified stealth techniques and thereby compromising further operations, and he would later receive his first individual award for actions at Anzio.

=== Anzio, 1944 ===
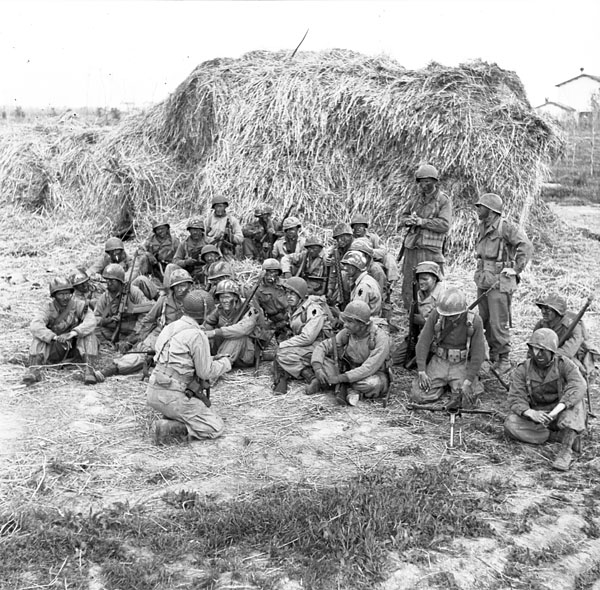
Personnel being briefed before setting out on a patrol at the Anzio beachhead

Following the Québec Conference in August 1943, General Dwight D. Eisenhower was moved to London to plan for the Normandy landings. Command of the Mediterranean Theatre was given to British General Henry Maitland Wilson. General Sir Harold Alexander, commanding the Allied Armies in Italy, had formulated the plan to land Allied troops at Anzio in order to outflank German positions in the area. German Field Marshal Albert Kesselring commanded the four German divisions at Anzio, which included the Hermann Goering Division and the 35th Panzer Grenadier Regiment of the 16th SS Panzergrenadier Division Reichsführer-SS Division. Combined German and Italian strength at Anzio was an estimated 70,000 men.

The Special Force brigade was withdrawn from the mountains in January and reinforced for its previous losses with some replacements recruited from existing U.S. and Canadian forces. On 1 February the FSSF was landed at the beachhead created by Operation Shingle at Anzio, south of Rome. They replaced the 1st and 3rd Ranger Battalions, which had suffered heavy losses in the disastrous defeat at the Battle of Cisterna. Together with the remnants of the Ranger battalions who were seconded to the Force the FSSF numbered about 1,200 men. However, there was insufficient time to train the new additions to the same high level of skill as the first generation of FSSF soldiers, and Frederick reported that the capabilities of the Brigade were no longer as finely prepared for special assignments.

Their task was to hold and raid from the right-hand flank of the beachhead marked by the Mussolini Canal/Pontine Marshes. This length of perimeter defense was about eight miles, twice the length of a front to defend as assigned to the entire U.S. Third Division at Anzio. 1st Regiment was positioned on the force's right front, which comprised one-third of the entire line, while the 3rd Regiment guarded the remaining two-thirds of the line. 2nd Regiment, which had been reduced to three companies following the attacks on La Difensa, Sammucio, and Majo, were tasked with running night patrols into Axis territory. Shortly after the SSF took over the Mussolini Canal sector, German units pulled back up to 0.5 miles (0.80 km) to avoid their aggressive patrols. The force's constant night raids forced Kesselring to fortify the German positions in their area with more men than he had originally planned. Reconnaissance missions performed by the Devils often went as deep as 1,500 feet (460 m) behind enemy lines.

Frederick was greatly admired by the soldiers of the First Special Service Force for his willingness to fight alongside the men in battle. On the beachhead in Anzio, for example, a nighttime Force patrol walked into a German minefield and was pinned down by machine gun fire. Colonel Frederick ran into battle and assisted the litter bearers in clearing the wounded Force members.

German prisoners were often surprised at how few men the force actually contained. A captured German lieutenant admitted to being under the assumption that the force was a division. Indeed, General Frederick ordered several trucks to move around the forces area in order to give the enemy the impression that the force comprised more men than it actually did. An order was found on another prisoner that stated that the Germans in Anzio would be "fighting an elite Canadian-American Force. They are treacherous, unmerciful and clever. You cannot afford to relax. The first soldier or group of soldiers capturing one of these men will be given a 10-day furlough."

It was at Anzio that the 1st Special Service Force inspired the "Black Devils" nickname, which appears to have been an invention of the Force's intelligence officers. There is no record of any German ever referring to the Force as "The Devil's Brigade". They were referred to as "black" devils because the brigade's members smeared their faces with black boot polish for their covert operations in the dark of the night. During Anzio, the 1st SSF fought for 99 days without relief. It was also at Anzio that the 1st SSF used their trademark stickers; during night patrols soldiers would carry stickers depicting the unit patch and a slogan written in German: "Das dicke Ende kommt noch," said to translate colloquially to "The worst is yet to come". Its literal translation is actually "The thick end is coming soon", implying that a larger force was on its way imminently, placing these stickers on German corpses and fortifications. Canadian and American members of the Special Force who lost their lives are buried near the beach in the Commonwealth Anzio War Cemetery and the American Cemetery in Nettuno, just east of Anzio.

When the U.S. Fifth Army's breakout offensive began on 25 May 1944, the 1st SSF was sent against Monte Arrestino, and attacked Rocca Massima on 27 May. The 1st SSF was given the assignment of capturing seven bridges in the city of Rome to prevent their demolition by the withdrawing Wehrmacht. During the night of 4 June, members of the 1st SSF entered Rome, through Porta San Paolo, one of the first Allied units to do so. After they secured and removed mines from the bridges, they quickly moved north in pursuit of the retreating Germans. Their command was placed in the American embassy in via Veneto.

In August 1944 1st SSF came under the command of Colonel Edwin Walker when Brigadier General Frederick, who had commanded the force since its earliest days, left on promotion to major general to command the 1st Airborne Task Force. Frederick became the youngest major general in the U.S. Army.

=== France, 1944 ===
On 14 August 1944, the 1st SSF, then restored by recruitment to a 2,000-man unit, landed on the islands of Port Cros and Île du Levant during Operation Dragoon, the invasion of southern France. They fought the small Battle of Port Cros in which they captured the five forts on the islands from the German Army. Nine men were killed in action or died of wounds received in combat.

On 22 August the Force was attached to Frederick's 1st Airborne Task Force, a provisional Seventh Army airborne division, and later made part of the Task Force.

In the first week of September the Force advanced through the French Riviera sector and on 5 September attacked and either killed or captured an entire German battalion of about 1,000 men near L'Escarène. On 7 September it moved with the 1st Airborne Task Force to defensive positions on the Franco-Italian border.

=== Disbandment, 1944 ===
The 1st SSF was disbanded 5 December 1944 in a field near Villeneuve-Loubet, on the extreme southeast Mediterranean coast of France. Villeneuve-Loubet holds a special place in the history of the Force, not only because the unit was broken up there, but also because it is one of the villages that the 1st SSF had the hardest time capturing in southern France, on 26 August 1944.

During the war the 1,800-man unit accounted for some 12,000 German casualties, captured some 7,000 prisoners, and sustained an attrition rate of over 600%.

Frederick had come to believe that the Force had become reliant upon assisting units of artillery and tanks, due to the type of assignments they were being given, and were no longer utilizing special operations skills. This was partly a result of the large numbers of recent recruits who were not trained to the same high standards of special operations as the initial Force members.

The day the unit was disbanded, the American commander held a parade honoring the unit. To end the ceremony, the Canadian elements were dismissed by being honored by the American troops with a Pass in Review, eyes right, officers salute. After the unit's break up, the Canadians were sent to other Canadian units (most of them became replacements for the 1st Canadian Parachute Battalion). Some American members were sent to airborne divisions as replacements, others to Ranger Battalions, and still others formed the 474th Infantry Regiment, which served with the Third United States Army and performed occupation duty in Norway. United States Army Special Forces Groups (lineal descendants of the First Special Service Force) celebrate Menton Day every 5 December with their Canadian military comrades and surviving members of the Force. Usually there is a combined parachute jump, a pass in review, and a formal ball.

== Unit awards, legacy and memorials ==
=== Unit awards ===
The First Special Service Force was awarded the French Croix de Guerre with Silver-Gilt Star, as well as the US Distinguished Unit Citation for extraordinary heroism.

In 2006, the Canadian members of the 1st Special Service Force received the United States Army's Combat Infantryman Badge for participation in front-line combat.

On 3 February 2015, the FSSF was awarded the Congressional Gold Medal, the highest award congress can give to civilians.

=== Individual awards ===
A large number of the "Devil's Brigade" members were honored for their acts of valor, including Tommy Prince, Canada's most decorated First Nations soldier of World War II. Prince did not receive an individual award for his actions at Monte Majo which neutralized the German defensive positions. Classified stealth information would have been revealed in such an award citation, thereby compromising further operations. Special operations soldiers today are often not awarded to avoid public exposure of special techniques or skills.

=== Descendant units ===
The 1st Special Service Force is claimed as a direct ancestor by two modern special operations units; the Canadian Special Operations Regiment (CSOR) of Canadian Special Operations Forces Command and the Special Forces Groups of the United States Army Special Operations Command.

In 1952, Colonel Aaron Bank (a former Jedburgh and Operational Group member of the Office of Strategic Services [OSS] during WW II) became the commander of 10th Special Forces Group (Airborne). Formal lineage for the 1st Special Forces Regiment (Not to be confused with the 1st Special Forces Group (Airborne)), established in 1958, was from the FSSF. (Special Forces carried the Ranger lineage from 1952 to 1958.) Much of the training in unconventional tactics, including strategies, and lessons learned, replicated training of the Operation Groups (OG) and Jedburghs of the OSS. In Canada Military Intelligence and Logistical Operations 1952–1988, the Canadian Airborne Regiment 1968–1995 which formed part of the Special Service Force 1977–1995 and today's CSOR, like United States Army Special Forces, trace their roots to the FSSF. Just like in World War II, Canada's elite JTF 2 and the United States' elite SFOD-D operators were united once again into a special assignment force for the 2001 invasion of Afghanistan.

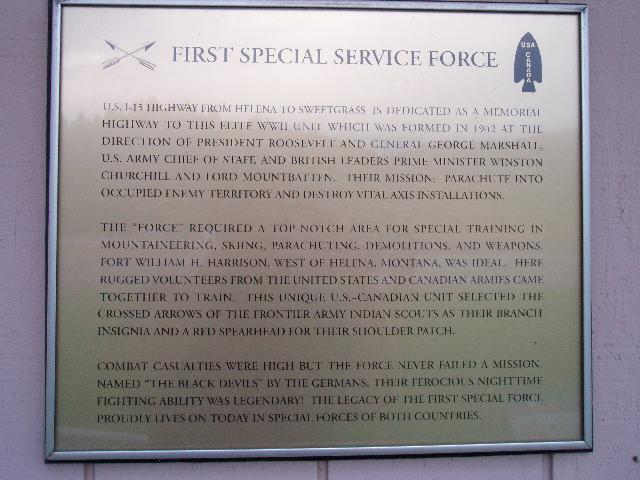
Plaque on Interstate 15 between Helena and Great Falls.

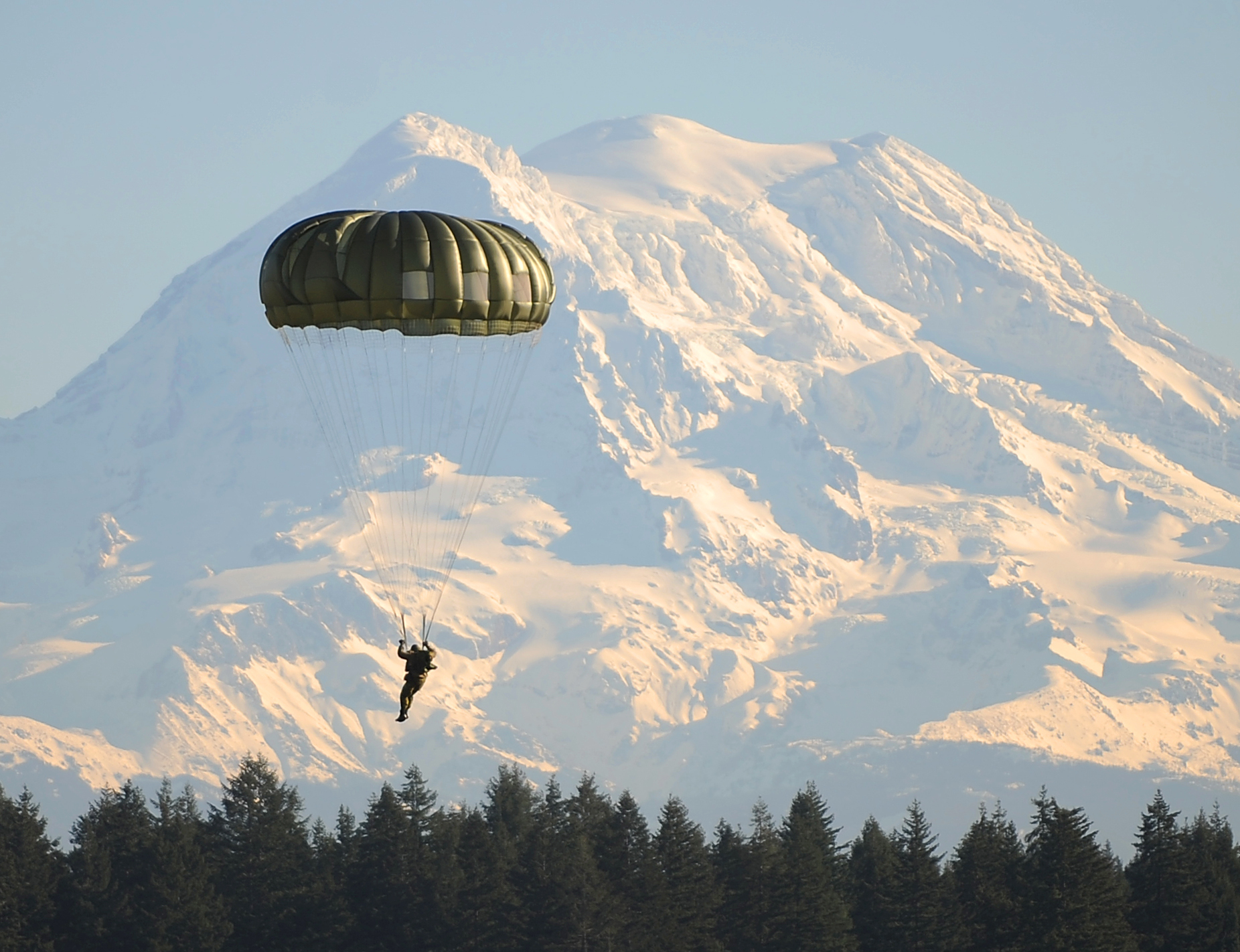
As part of the brigade's 65th anniversary celebration, a Canadian special operator arrives at Fort Lewis.

=== Other memorials ===
In 1996, Interstate 15 in Montana between Helena and Sweet Grass was renamed the "First Special Service Force Memorial Highway". This highway was chosen because it was the route taken in 1942 by the Canadian volunteers to join their American counterparts for training at Fort Harrison. The entire length of Alberta Highway 4 received the same name in 1999.

The Force is also memorialized in several commemorative plaques mounted in city halls and along the route they fought in Italy and Southern France, including one outside the Protestant Cemetery, Rome, next to the Pyramid of Cestius and another on the Embassy of the United States in Rome, facing Via Vittorio Veneto.

=== U.S. Army Special Forces Tab ===
When the Special Forces Tab was created in 1983 for wear by members of the U.S. Army Special Forces, it was also retroactively awarded to members of wartime combat units that had been identified as predecessors of the Special Forces. Thus, any soldier who had spent 120 days in wartime service with the First Special Service Force was authorized to wear the Special Forces Tab.

== Media depictions ==
The Devil's Brigade is a 1968 film starring William Holden, Cliff Robertson, and Vince Edwards, focusing on the force's training and deployment to Italy.

The 1968 film Anzio featured Peter Falk as Corporal Jack Rabinoff, who identified himself to co-star Robert Mitchum as a member of the American-Canadian 1st Special Service Force.

Three documentaries have been made about the force: "Black Devils" in 2000, an episode of History Channel's "Dangerous Missions" series, written produced and directed by Darryl Rehr; Daring to Die: The Story of the Black Devils, written and directed by Greg Hancock and Wayne Abbot, and Devil's Brigade, a 2006 TV miniseries produced by Frantic Films.

In November, 2019, a Bravery In Arms documentary was produced of the First Special Service Force assault on Monte Majo. In the documentary, the actual location of the battle was shown.

Quentin Tarantino's 2009 film Inglourious Basterds features a character named Lt. Aldo Raine aka "Aldo the Apache" played by Brad Pitt who wears the unit's crossed arrows collar insignia and red arrowhead shoulder patch. Tarantino cited the FSSF as an influence.

The Devil's Brigade by Robert H. Adleman & George H. Walton is an autobiography and historical reference for the First Special Service Force.

The Marvel Comics character Wolverine claimed several times that he was a member of the Devil's Brigade during the war — being Canadian-born during the last years of Queen Victoria's reign, it fits. He also claimed he took part in Anzio and Cassino battles.

== Bibliography ==
=== Books ===
- Adleman, Robert H.; Colonel George Walton (1966). The Devil's Brigade. Philadelphia, Pennsylvania: Chilton Books. ISBN 1-59114-004-8.
- Burhans, Robert D. (1947). The First Special Service Force: A Canadian/American Wartime Alliance: The Devil's Brigade. Washington, D.C.: Infantry Journal Press Inc.
- Cottingham, Peter Layton Once Upon a Wartime: A Canadian Who Survived the Devil's Brigade (P.L. Cottingham, Manitoba Canada, 1996)
- Gassend, Jean-Loup (2014). Autopsy of a Battle: the Allied Liberation of the French Riviera, August September 1944. Atglen PA: Schiffer Publishing. ISBN 9780764345807.
- Hope, Tom, ed. Bonding for Life: The post World War II story of the elite strike brigade, First Special Service Force (First Special Service Force Association, 2007) ISBN 978-0-9797275-0-4
- Joyce, Kenneth H. (2006). Snow Plough and the Jupiter Deception – The Story of the 1st Special Service Force and the 1st Canadian Special Service Battalion – 1942–1945. St. Catharines, Ontario: Vanwell Publishing. ISBN 1-55125-094-2.
- Nadler, John (2005). A Perfect Hell: The true story of the FSSF, Forgotten Commandos of the Second World War. Doubleday Canada. ISBN 0-385-66140-1.
- Hicks, Ann (2006). The Last Fighting General: The Biography of Robert Tryon Frederick. Schiffer Publishing Ltd. ISBN 0-7643-2430-6.
- Peppard, Herb (1994). The Light Hearted Soldier: A Canadian's Exploits with the Black Devils in WWII. Halifax, Nova Scotia: Nimbus Publishing. ISBN 1551090678 .
- Ross, Robert Todd (2000). The Supercommandos First Special Service Force, 1942-1942, An Illustrated History. Atglen, Pennsylvania: Schiffer Publishing Ltd. ISBN 0-7643-1171-9.
- Springer, Joseph (2001). The Black Devil Brigade: The True Story of the First Special Service Force. Pacifica Military History. ISBN 0-935553-50-9.
- Stanton, Shelby, World War II Order of Battle: An Encyclopedic Reference to U.S. Army Ground Forces from Battalion through Division, 1939-1946 (Revised Edition, 2006), Stackpole Books ISBN 0-8117-0157-3
- Werner, Brett (2006). First Special Service Force 1942 – 44. Osprey Publishing. ISBN 1-84176-968-1.
- Wickham, Kenneth. "An Adjutant General Remembers" (Adjutant General's Corps Regimental Association, 1991).
- Wood, James (Autumn 2003). "'Matters Canadian' and the Problem with Being Special: Robert T. Frederick on the First Special Service Force". Canadian Military History. 12 (4): 17–33.
- Wood, James A. We Move Only Forward: Canada, the United States, and the First Special Service Force, 1942–1944 (St. Catharines, Ontario: Vanwell Publishing, 2006).
