= The Devil's Brigade (film) =

1968 film by Andrew V. McLaglen

- Original film poster by Sandy Kossin
- Directed by: Andrew V. McLaglen
- Screenplay by: William Roberts
- Based on: The Devil's Brigade; 1966 novel by Robert H. Adleman and George Walton
- Produced by: David L. Wolper
- Starring: William Holden; Cliff Robertson; Vince Edwards; Michael Rennie; Dana Andrews; Gretchen Wyler; Andrew Prine; Claude Akins; Carroll O'Connor; Richard Jaeckel; Jack Watson; Paul Hornung; Gene Fullmer
- Cinematography: William H. Clothier
- Edited by: William T. Cartwright
- Music by: Alex North
- Production company: Wolper Pictures
- Distributed by: United Artists
- Release dates: May 14, 1968 (Premiere); May 15, 1968 (US)
- Running time: 130 minutes
- Country: United States
- Language: English
- Box office: $8,000,000

The Devil's Brigade is a 1968 American DeLuxe Color war film filmed in Panavision, based on the 1966 book of the same name co-written by American novelist and historian Robert H. Adleman and Col. George Walton, a member of the brigade.

The film recounts the formation, training, and first mission of the 1st Special Service Force, a joint American-Canadian commando unit, known as the Devil's Brigade. The film dramatizes the Brigade's first two missions in the Italian Campaign, building up to the finale: capturing what is considered an impregnable German mountain stronghold, Monte la Difensa.

== Plot ==
In the summer of 1942, American Lieutenant Colonel Robert T. Frederick, a War Department staff officer with no prior combat or command experience, is summoned to Britain where he is selected by Admiral Lord Louis Mountbatten to raise a commando force composed of both American and Canadian personnel for operations in German-occupied Norway.

Back in the U.S., Frederick arrives at the derelict Fort William Henry Harrison in Montana, where he receives his American troops — all of whom are jailbirds, ne'er-do-wells, and misfits. When the hand-picked elite Canadian contingent arrives there is immediate friction with the Americans and chaos ensues. By the time Frederick manages to overcome the national rivalries and mold the First Special Service Force into a highly trained commando unit, he is informed that the Allied High Command have had a change of heart and offered the Norwegian missions to British troops. Left without a role, the brigade is ordered to be disbanded and its soldiers reassigned. Frederick remains undeterred and manages to persuade Lieutenant General Mark Clark to give his men a chance to prove themselves with a new mission in Italy.

Clark's skeptical deputy commander, Major General Maxwell Hunter, orders the 1st Special Service Force to reconnoiter a Wehrmacht garrison in an Italian bottleneck, but Frederick goes one better and captures the entire town. In the process, they earn the nickname "Die Teufelsbrigade" — The Devil's Brigade.

Convinced now of the ability of Frederick's men, Lieutenant General Clark promotes Frederick to full Colonel and gives them a task no other Allied troops have managed to accomplish — to capture Monte la Difensa. Facing severe obstacles, the Devil's Brigade attacks the undefended eastern side of the mountain by scaling a cliff the Germans believed to be impregnable. Reaching the top as a unit, they take the stronghold despite considerable losses, allowing the Allies to continue their advance north into Italy.

== Cast ==
- William Holden as Lt. Col./Col. Robert T. Frederick
- Cliff Robertson as Maj. Alan Crown (Based on Lt. Col Thomas Cail MacWilliam)
- Vince Edwards as Maj. Cliff Bricker
- Andrew Prine as Pvt. Theodore Ransom
- Jeremy Slate as Sgt. Patrick O'Neill
- Claude Akins as Pvt./Cpl. Rockwell W. "Rocky" Rockman
- Jack Watson as Cpl./Sgt. Peacock
- Richard Jaeckel as Pvt./Cpl. Omar Greco
- Bill Fletcher as Pvt. Billy 'Bronc' Guthrie
- Richard Dawson as Pte./Cpl. Hugh MacDonald
- Tom Troupe as Pvt. Al Manella
- Luke Askew as Pvt. Hubert Hixon
- Jean-Paul Vignon as Pte. Henri Laurent
- Tom Stern as Capt. Cardwell, Garrison CO of Fort William Henry Harrison
- Harry Carey Jr. as Capt. Rose
- Michael Rennie as Lt. Gen. Mark W. Clark, Commander of the U.S. Fifth Army
- Carroll O'Connor as Maj. Gen. Maxwell Hunter
- Dana Andrews as Brig. Gen. Walter Naylor
- Gretchen Wyler as the Lady of Joy
- Patric Knowles as Admiral Lord Louis Mountbatten
- Wilhelm Von Homburg as Fritz
- Maggie Thrett as Millie
- James Craig as Maj. Gen. Knapp
- Richard Simmons as Gen. Bixby
- Norman Alden as the M.P. Lieutenant
- Don Megowan as Luke Phelan
- Paul Hornung as Lumberjack
- Gene Fullmer as Bartender
- Alix Talton as Miss Arnold
- Alan Caillou as Gen. Marlin
- Hal Needham as Sergeant
- Patrick Waltz as Hunter's Aide

== Production ==
=== Development ===
The producer David L. Wolper was a noted documentary filmmaker interested in getting into feature films. He purchased the film rights to Robert H. Adleman and Col. George Walton's book in October 1965. He had already bought the rights to the book The Bridge at Remagen by Kenneth William Hechler, which was later adapted into the 1969 film of the same name. Wolper said he was attracted to the material because he did not want to be typed as a serious documentary filmmaker. "It's based on truth but it's a 'movie movie' a fun and games type thing," he said.

United Artists agreed to finance the film. Wolper hired William Roberts to write a script. The producer later wrote in his memoirs that "this was my first feature but I was not in the slightest bit intimidated." In October 1966, William Holden agreed to star. The following month, Andrew McLaglen agreed to direct. David Niven and Dan Blocker were offered roles in the film, but declined. The U.S. Department of Defense and the Canadian Department of National Defence both agreed to assist the film production. Cliff Robertson was selected to play Holden's co-star - the two men had previously appeared together in Picnic (1955).

=== Shooting ===
Filming started on April 15, 1967. The motion picture was filmed with the 19th Special Forces Group at Camp Williams, Utah, 20 miles south of Salt Lake City, with battle locations on Lone Peak near Draper, Utah, and on location in Sant'Elia Fiumerapido, Italy. Parts of the film were also shot in Park City, Lehi, Alpine, Solitude and Granite Mountain in Utah.

Wolper realized it would be as cheap to shoot in an Italian village as building an Italian set in America. However, the birthday scene which is set in Italy was filmed at the National Guard Armory in Salt Lake City, with Brigham Young University students as extras. The U.S. National Guard Bureau provided 300 members of the Utah National Guard to portray soldiers in the mass battle scenes filmed. Wolper had the Brigade wear attractive but fictional red berets that appeared as well as on the film's posters and on the tie-in paperback cover of Adelman and Walton's book.

The cast of The Devil's Brigade included former star NFL running back Paul Hornung and former World Middleweight Champion boxer Gene Fullmer in minor roles. They can be seen in the barroom brawl sequence, Hornung as a belligerent lumberjack and Fullmer as the bartender. Wolper later wrote that Holden was very cooperative during the shoot in Utah, only drinking wine, but in Italy his drinking got out of control. Wolper had to call on the assistance of a woman in Paris who had dealt with Holden before and helped him finish the film on schedule. Filming concluded on July 3, 1967, in London.

=== Post production ===
McLaglen said when he showed the finished cut to United Artists they "loved" the film.

But the producer had a big projection room in his house, and he showed the movie for a solid week to a hundred people, and I think a hundred people had ideas of what we should do with the movie... And without me having any input – I didn't have the last say – they cut the movie and, in the end, it was not nearly as good as it could have been. I had a great ending, and a lot of good stuff in there, and he didn't know what he was doing. I still worry about that.

== Soundtrack ==
Alex North composed the score of the film, re-purposing the theme from his rejected score to the pilot episode of The Rat Patrol. At the time of release only a cover version of the soundtrack album by Leroy Holmes was released by United Artists Records. The album was illustrated with the original Sandy Kossin artwork of the film and featured instrumental (with whistling) and a male chorus singing lyrics to North's title theme. The album also contained cover versions of other North themes from the film as well as 1940s popular music that appeared in the film.

In 2007 Film Score Monthly and Intrada Records released a limited CD edition of North's original score with Kossin's artwork including alternate versions of the title theme, North's own arrangements of four 1940s' jazz popular tunes, two traditional Christmas carols, and the pipe band version of "Scotland the Brave" featuring in the film.

== Release ==
The film had its world premiere on May 14, 1968, at the Michigan Theater, Detroit, and at the Vanity Theater in Windsor, Ontario, in Canada. It opened at an additional 5 theaters in Detroit the following day.

== Reception ==
=== Box office ===
The film was the fourth-most-popular movie in general release in Britain in 1968, after The Jungle Book, Barbarella and Carry on Doctor.

Wolper later wrote "The Devil's Brigade turned out to be a terrific film. It was a wonderful story, the acting was excellent, and the preview audiences and critics loved it. Unfortunately it came out just a few months after the release of The Dirty Dozen, which was the same kind of story. It was a big hit and it killed us. We got lost in the wind."

On the review aggregator website Rotten Tomatoes, 57% of 7 critics' reviews are positive.

=== Accuracy ===
To the veterans of the Force, the film was historically inaccurate. In a TV documentary Suicide Missions: The Black Devils, Force member Bill Story stated: "The Devil's Brigade was and is a very entertaining war movie. But as a piece of accurate history it's sheer nonsense. There was never an aspect of The Dirty Dozen. This was absolutely not true."

Canadian military historian and writer Tim Cook said of the film “It is a rousing wartime adventure that I find repays with each viewing. Over the years, veterans have told me they also enjoyed the film. One chuckled with pleasure and said he remembered it differently, however. Indeed.”

== See also ==
- List of American films of 1968

== Notes ==
- Wolper, David L.; Fisher, David (2003). Producer: A Memoir. Scribner. ISBN 9780743236874.
