= Battle of Monte la Difensa =

1943 battle of the Italian Campaign in WWII

- Part of the fighting for the Bernhardt Line
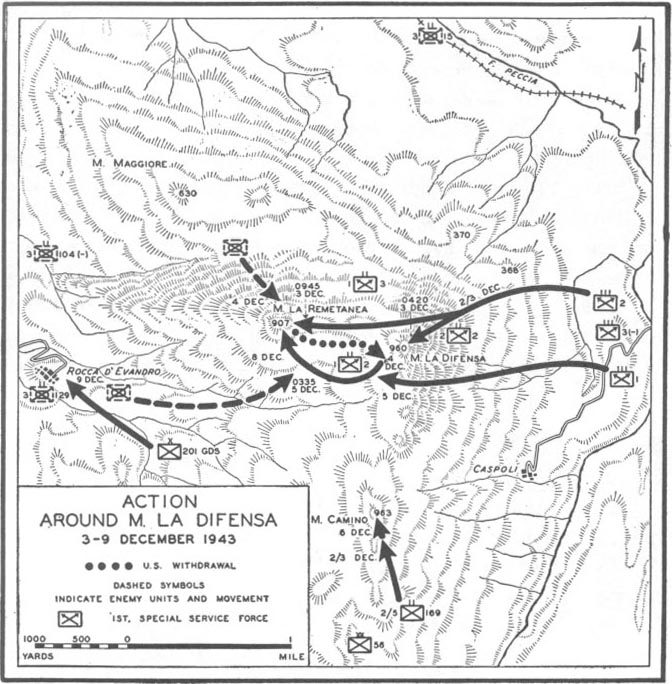
- Action around Monte La Difensa 3–9 December 1943
Date	December 3, 1943 – December 9, 1943
Location	Hill 960, Italy 41°22′59.88″N 13°55′59.77″E
Result	Allied victory

Belligerents
United Kingdom; United States; Canada	Germany

The Battle of Monte La Difensa took place between 3 December and 9 December 1943 during Operation Raincoat, part of the Battle for the Bernhardt Line during the Italian campaign in World War II.

== Background ==
Monte La Difensa (also known as Hill 960) was one of the peaks forming the Camino hill mass which formed the left-hand "gatepost" dominating the Mignano Gap, key to the U.S. Fifth Army's route to Cassino, the Liri valley, and thence to Rome. The mountain itself had become a stalemate for American and British troops because of the defenses employed by the German troops, part of the Bernhardt Line.

== The battle ==
The action was the first combat in the Italian theatre for the US-Canadian commando unit 1st Special Service Force (1st SSF). They were attached to the U.S. 36th Infantry Division. The 1st SSF used the special training that they had received in winter and mountain warfare to scale the mountain and overcome the Germans atop the stronghold.

With the rest of 36th Division on 1st SSF's right attacking Monte Maggiore and British 56th Infantry Division (attacking Monte Camino) and British 46th Infantry Division on their left, it took 5 days heavy fighting for the Camino hill mass to be cleared. Casualties were high. After a pause to regroup the U.S. Fifth Army renewed its offensive but it took until mid-January to advance the 10 miles (16 km) to Cassino at the mouth of the Liri valley and the formidable Gustav Line defenses, where the Allies were halted by stubborn German defense until May 1944.

== In media ==
- The successful assault on Difensa was the setting for the climax of the 1968 motion picture, The Devil's Brigade.
- Part 2 of the series WW2 Greatest Raids called "Mountain Massacre", depicting the battle, was broadcast by National Geographic.

== See also ==
- Winter Line

== Sources ==
- Fifth Army at the Winter Line 15 November 1943 - 15 January 1944. American Forces in Action series. Washington: United States Army Center of Military History. 1990 [1945]. CMH Pub 100-9. Archived from the original on 21 November 2012.
