= Lone Peak (Utah) =

Mountain in the U.S. state of Utah

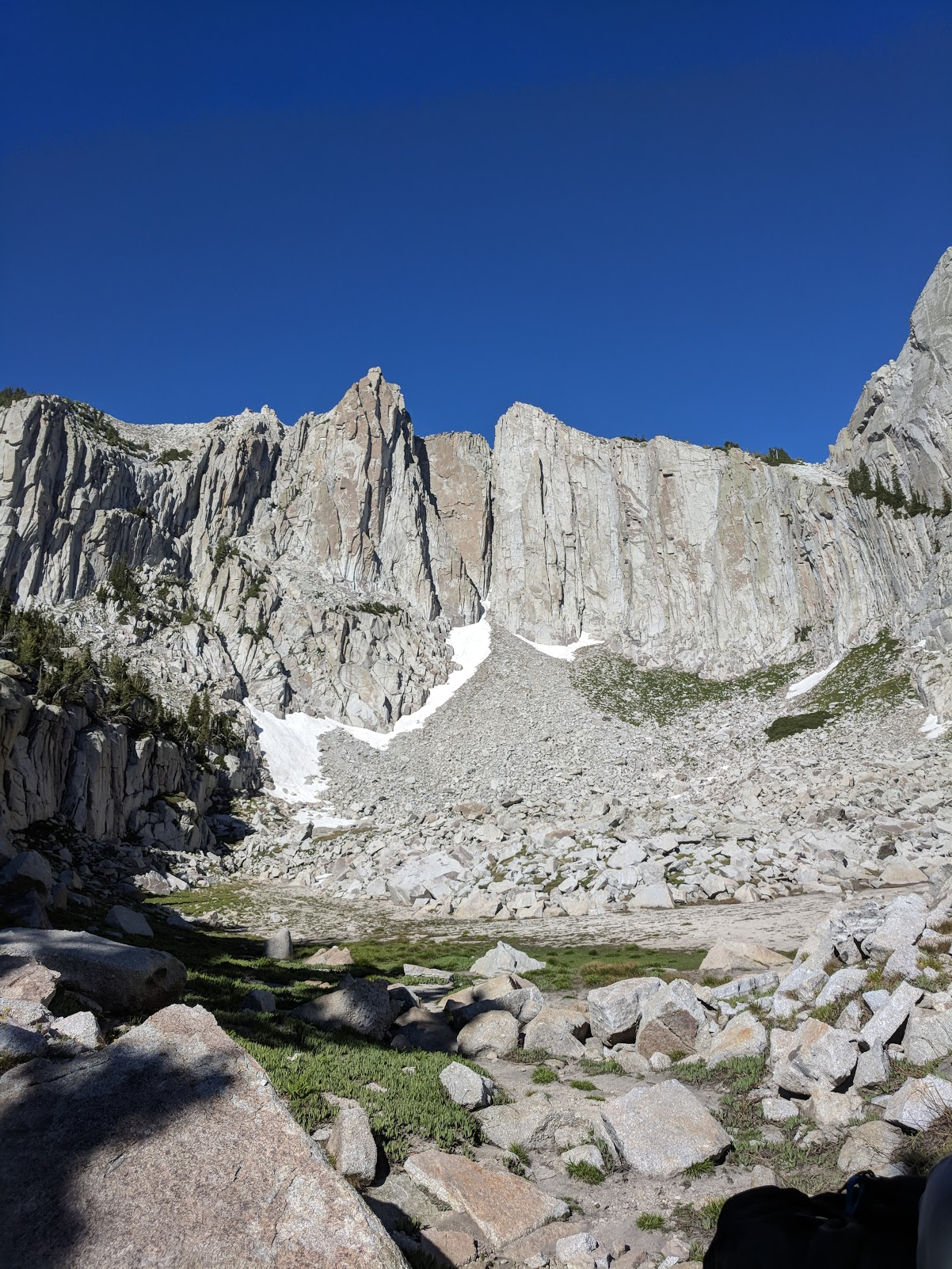
- Summit of Lone Peak

Highest point
- Elevation: 11,260 feet (3,432 m) NAVD 88
- Prominence: 893 ft (272 m)
- Coordinates: 40°31′37″N 111°45′22″W

Geography
- Location within Utah
- Location: Salt Lake County / Utah County, Utah, U.S.
- Parent range: Wasatch Range
- Topo map: USGS Draper

Geology
- Mountain type: Quartz monzonite

Lone Peak is a mountain summit in the Wasatch Range southeast of Salt Lake City, Utah, United States, and the center of the Lone Peak Wilderness, established in 1978. With an elevation of 11,260 feet (3,430 m), it is one of the highest peaks in the range and among the most prominent of the Wasatch Front, towering over the Salt Lake City suburb of Draper and easily visible from most of the valley, which makes it a popular destination for hiking and rock climbing. it is the final peak in the Wasatch Ultimate Ridge Linkup (WURL).

The first person in recorded history to scale the summit of Lone Peak was Richard Bell, Sr. of Riverton, Utah. Bell also led the first recorded climb of the Lone Peak Cirque. He went on to lead several expeditions and taught many alpine guides. Bells Canyon is named for him and is still a common route to the summit.

Lone Peak consists almost entirely of quartz monzonite (a granitoid or granite-like rock) of the 30.5 million-year-old Little Cottonwood Stock. Quartzite and limestone are also found in distal locations on the mountain. The high mountain ridge stretching from Little Cottonwood Canyon on the northern end to Corner Canyon on the southern end, the highest peak of which is Lone Peak. Nearby peaks include Ennis Peak and Big Horn Peak. Lone Peak ranks 98th by elevation on the list of Utah peaks with at least 500 feet (150 m) of topographic prominence.

== Climate ==
Climate data for Lone Peak 40.5264 N, 111.7608 W, Elevation: 10,659 ft (3,249 m) (1991–2020 normals)
Month	Jan	Feb	Mar	Apr	May	Jun	Jul	Aug	Sep	Oct	Nov	Dec	Year
Mean daily maximum °F (°C)	27.7 (−2.4)	27.5 (−2.5)	32.4 (0.2)	37.6 (3.1)	47.5 (8.6)	59.9 (15.5)	69.3 (20.7)	67.6 (19.8)	58.5 (14.7)	45.4 (7.4)	33.8 (1.0)	27.2 (−2.7)	44.5 (7.0)
Daily mean °F (°C)	18.6 (−7.4)	17.6 (−8.0)	21.9 (−5.6)	26.6 (−3.0)	36.1 (2.3)	47.4 (8.6)	56.1 (13.4)	54.7 (12.6)	46.1 (7.8)	34.5 (1.4)	24.5 (−4.2)	18.2 (−7.7)	33.5 (0.9)
Mean daily minimum °F (°C)	9.4 (−12.6)	7.6 (−13.6)	11.5 (−11.4)	15.6 (−9.1)	24.6 (−4.1)	34.8 (1.6)	43.0 (6.1)	41.9 (5.5)	33.6 (0.9)	23.7 (−4.6)	15.3 (−9.3)	9.3 (−12.6)	22.5 (−5.3)
Average precipitation inches (mm)	7.19 (183)	6.14 (156)	6.14 (156)	6.25 (159)	4.36 (111)	1.94 (49)	1.21 (31)	1.84 (47)	2.83 (72)	4.16 (106)	5.46 (139)	6.06 (154)	53.58 (1,363)
Source: PRISM Climate Group

== Hiking/Backpacking ==
Lone Peak Hiking/Backpacking Details
Summit:	11,260 feet (3,432 m)
Estimated Starting Elevation:	5,600 feet
Average Total Distance:	15.6 miles round-trip
Time Needed:	1–2 days
Rating:	Difficult

There are several popular routes to reach the summit of Lone Peak, with different distances and starting elevations. The most common routes approach the peak from the south. It is possible to reach the summit in one long day, but rock climbers often camp at the base of the summit and non-climbers often camp lower on the Jacob's Ladder Trail. There are a few streams along the routes which tend to dry up before summer, so water must be carried along. There is reportedly a spring that runs year-round.

=== Jacob's Ladder Trail ===
The shortest and arguably the most popular route is the Jacob's Ladder Trail, which begins at a trailhead located at 40°29′39″N 111°48′59″W. It is located near a large turnout on the right side of the road and is marked with a sign. Several other hiking and mountain biking trails start from the same parking area, and three four-wheel drive tracks climb the road bank on the north side of the road; a wooden fence leads to the starting point of the trail. A major section of the trail, climbing from the lower two-track roads to the meadow below Ennis Peak, was rebuilt in 2022, adding several miles to the round-trip hiking distance but substantially decreasing the steep grade of the previous trail by introducing numerous switchbacks. Round-trip mileage is about 15.6 miles, with approximately 5,603 feet of vertical gain. as you approach the summit, class 3-4 scrambling is required to reach the summit

=== Draper Ridge Trail ===
The Draper Ridge Trail is currently inactive. The trail is in a deteriorated condition, as the top of the trail is very exposed to weather. Towards the bottom, thick undergrowth prevents passage. The Jacob's Ladder Trailhead is just up the road. The Jacob's Ladder Trail and the Draper Ridge Trail eventually merge, sharing the same trail for the last two-thirds of the route.

=== Cherry Canyon Logging Trail ===
Important features of this trail are that it has a year-round spring (cold springs) located at 40°30′58″N 111°47′35″W and a small cabin in a meadow. The route gains altitude in the beginning, going through a steep scrub oak section. After a few hours of hiking, the trail levels off and veers north into the trees crossing the water of cold springs in Bear Canyon. The trail climbs out of the drainage on the north side into a new drainage, but stays generally below the ridgeline. The trail eventually opens into a meadow with a small cabin in the large pine trees. The trail continues up above the cabin to the southeast and crosses over to the south into another drainage at a low point on the ridge. The southeast top of the new drainage meets up with the main granite drainage running roughly north-south which leads to the Lone Peak Cirque via stacked rock cairns. An alternate route is to follow the approximate course of the streambed up the drainage until the top of the ridge that runs roughly north-south above a granite drainage is reached. Round-trip mileage is about 16 miles with 6,876 feet of vertical gain.

== Outlaw Cabin ==
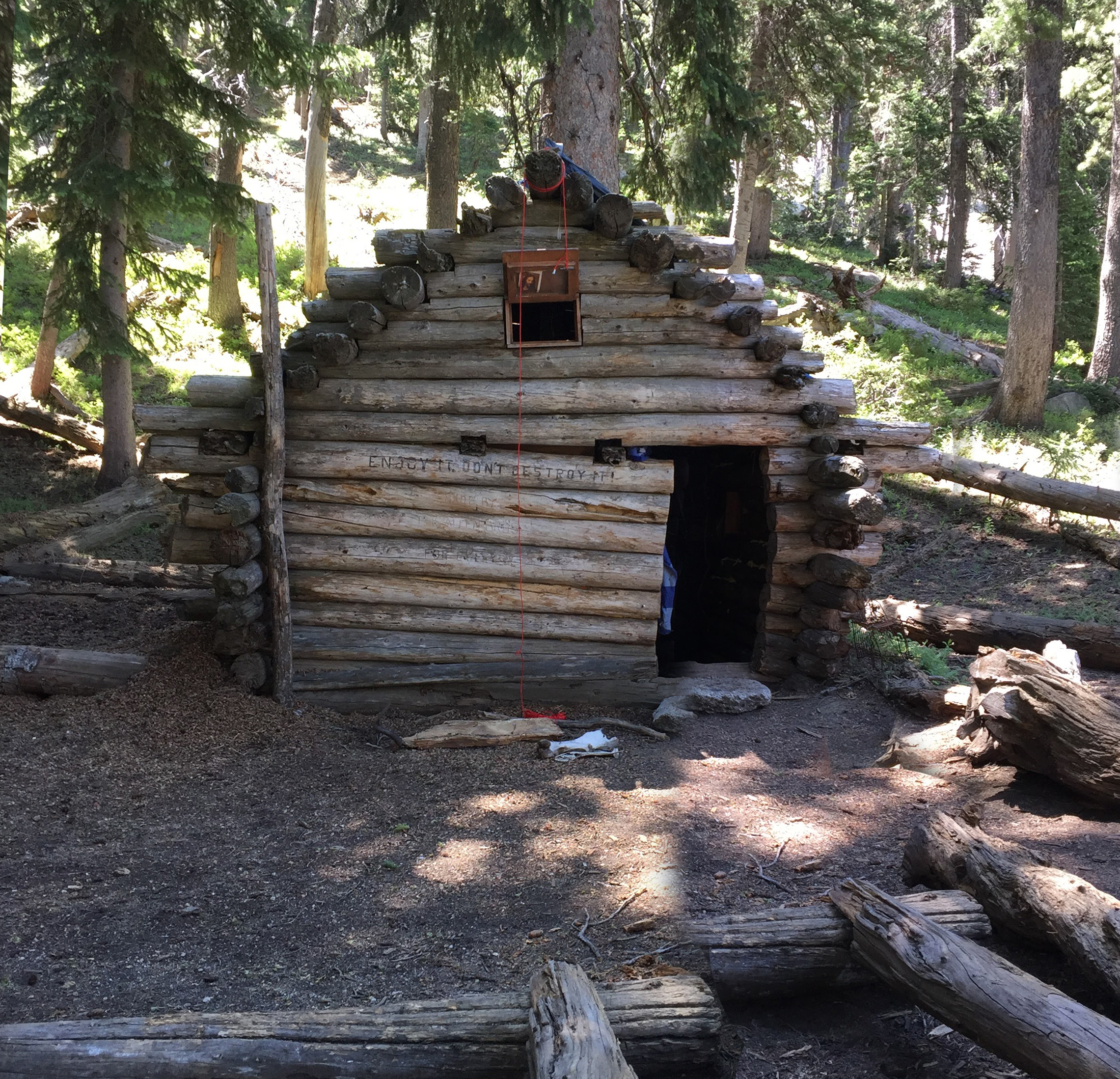
Outlaw Cabin

The Outlaw Cabin, located at 40°31′12″N 111°46′53″W on the southwest side of a meadow, was constructed in the summer of 1960 by the Allen Brothers and Alan Summerhays. Construction was completed in 1967 prior to the area being designated a wilderness area. The cabin has three cots, a potbelly stove, cabinets, and two small windows. It is built from trees downed in the area and the roof is lined with plastic and dirt/grass for insulation. All the materials besides the trees were hauled to the location by horseback. The cabin is partially hidden by large trees. In October 1997, a family from Draper was caught in a blinding snow storm and took shelter in the cabin until they were rescued. There is a journal in the cabin that visitors can add their stories to.

== Deaths on Lone Peak ==
- December 15, 1936 - Seven died when a Western Air Express Boeing 247 crashed just below Hardy Ridge on Lone Peak. The major parts of the aircraft were hurled over the ridge and fell over a thousand feet into a basin below.
- July 25, 2002 - Two hikers were struck by lightning near the summit of Lone Peak while they were trying to seek shelter.
- September 8, 2015 - A woman fell 200–300 feet near the cirque. Her body was found the next day.
- June 17, 2017 - An extreme trailrunner fell about 500 feet near Big Horn Peak while approaching Lone Peak.
- May 9, 2024 - Two skiers died after being caught in an avalanche near Lone Peak.

== Movie Rocks ==
- The 1968 film The Devil's Brigade was filmed in Utah. The attack on a Nazi mountain stronghold in Italy was filmed on the lower part of Lone Peak at a place called "Movie Rocks". The trail leading there is just to the west of the Jacob's Ladder trail.

== Images ==
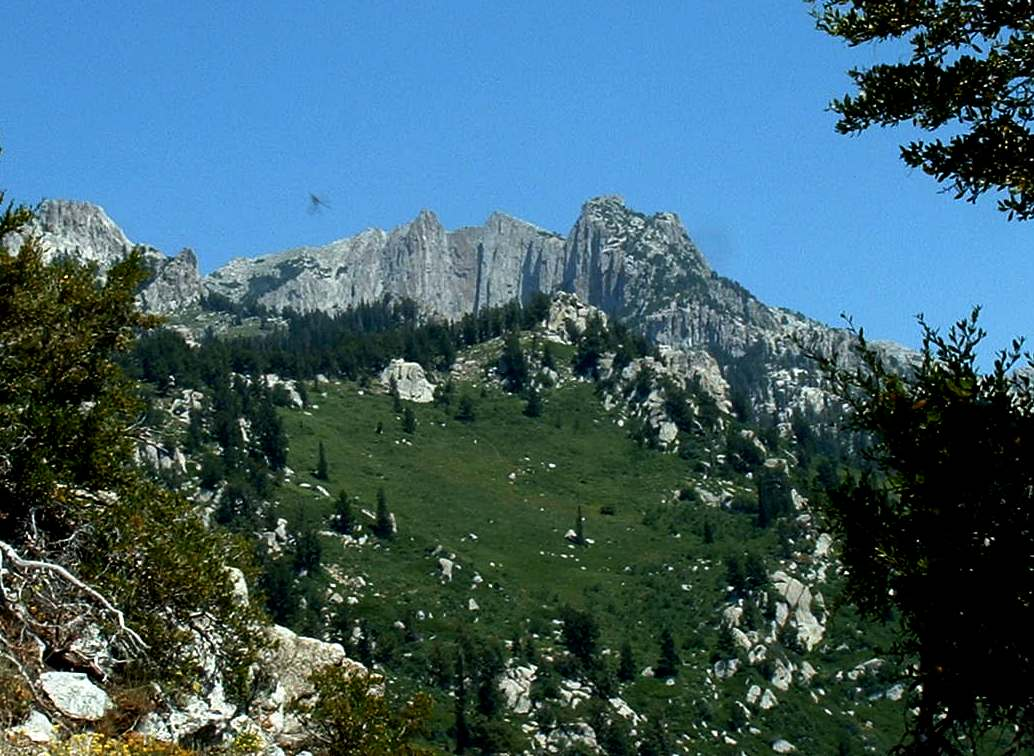
Lone Peak from Jacob's Ladder trail

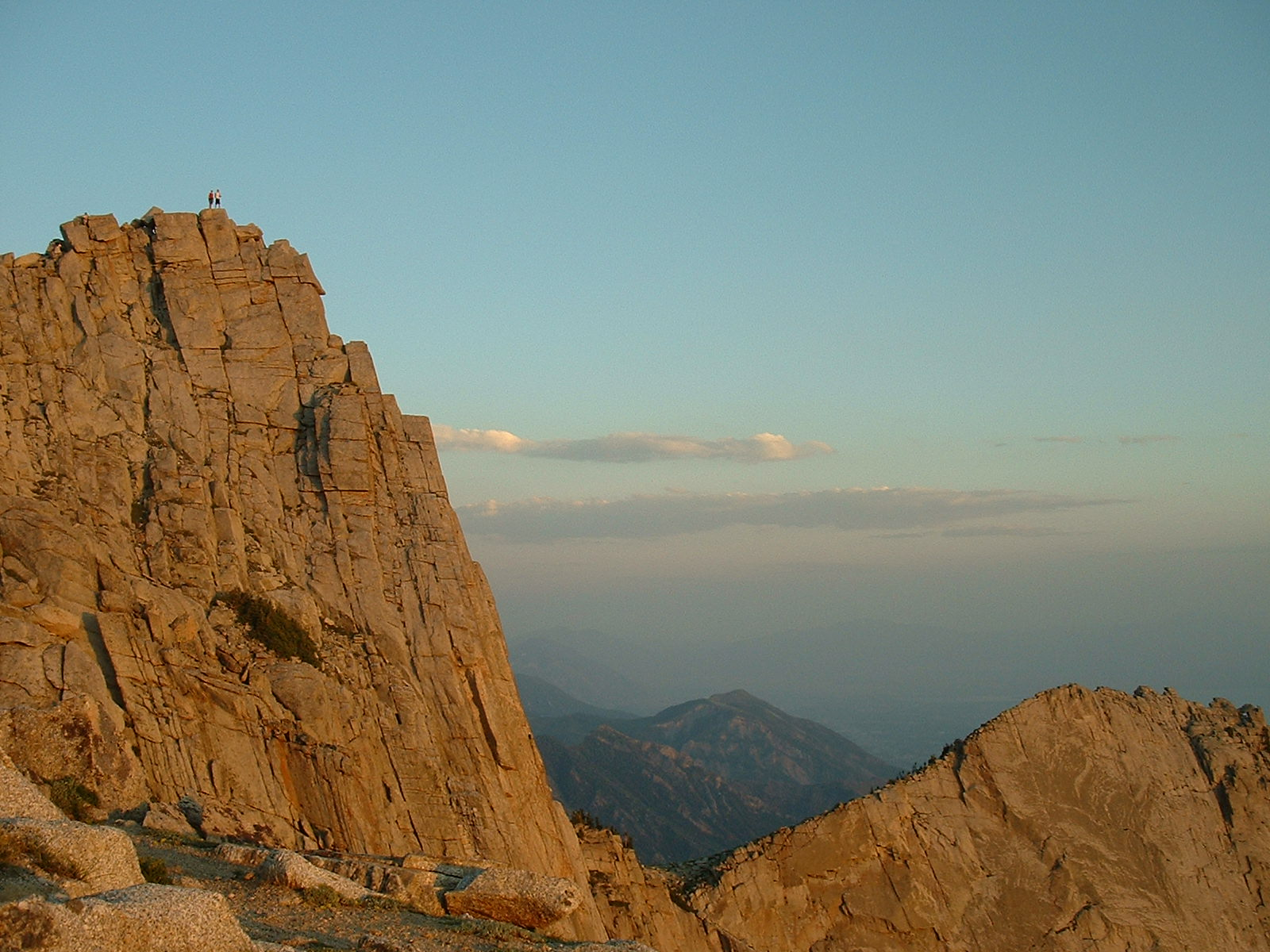
Looking South at Lone Peak and Question Mark Wall

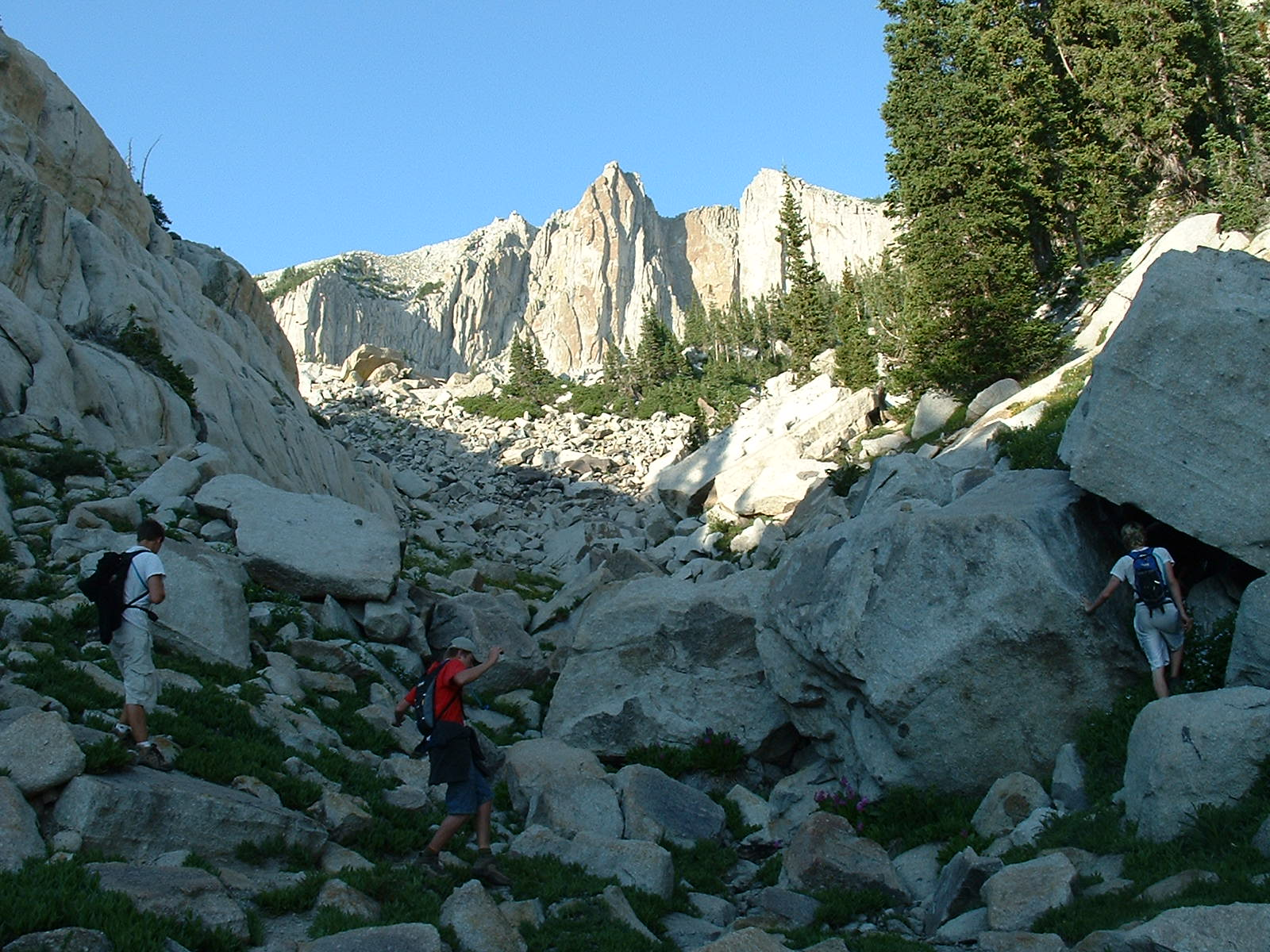
Scrambling may be required

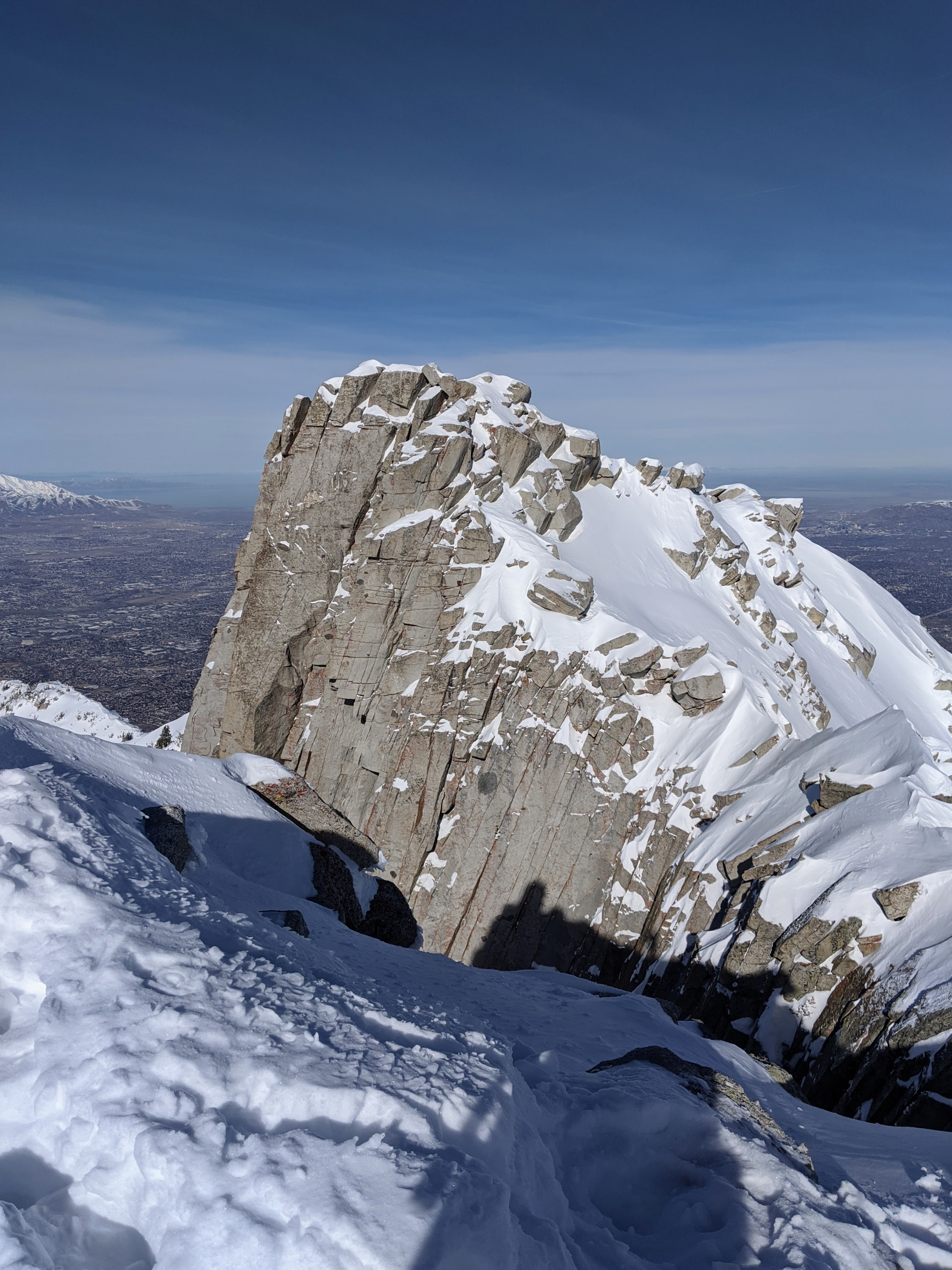
Summit in the winter

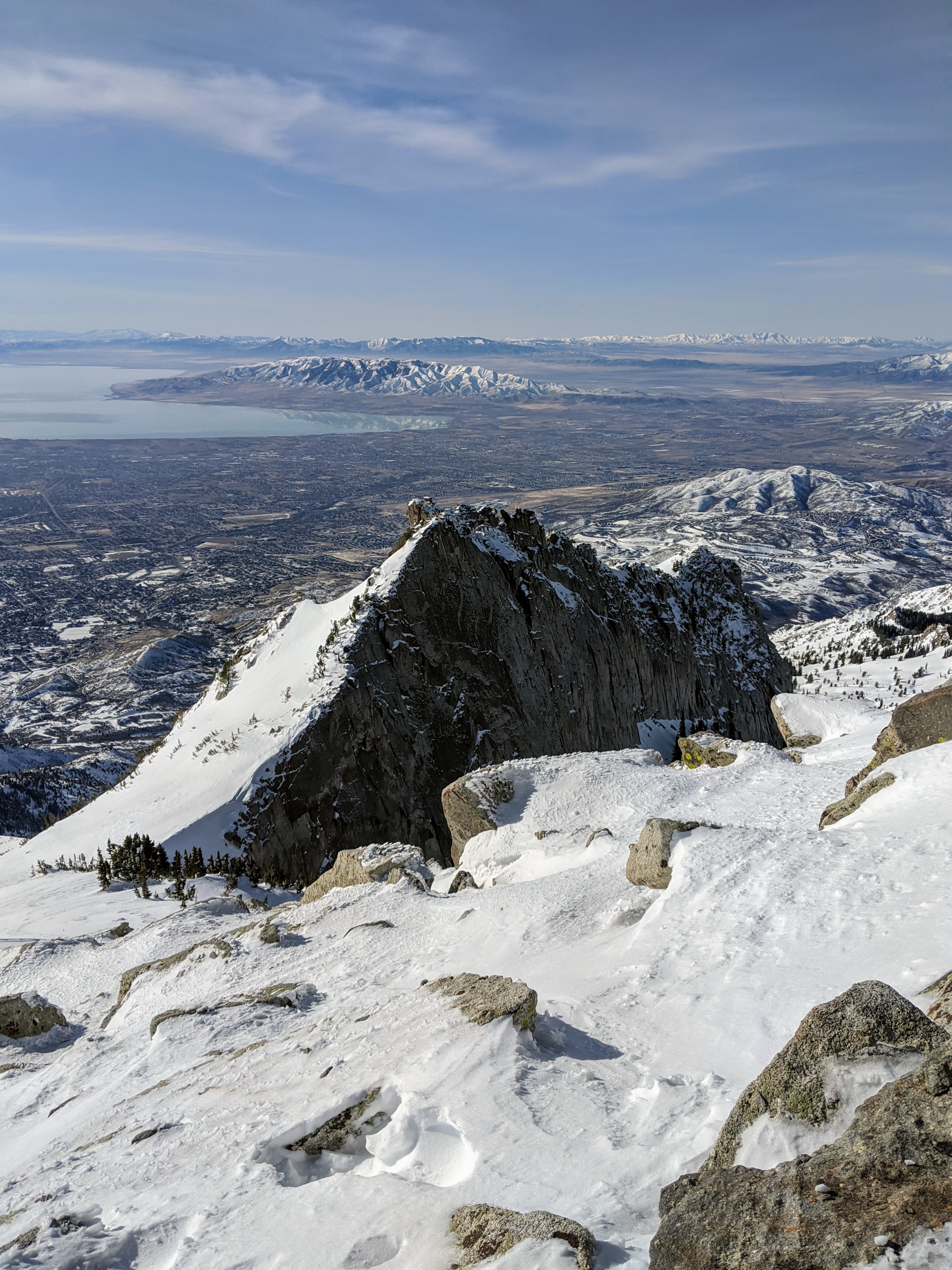
View of the Question Mark wall in the winter

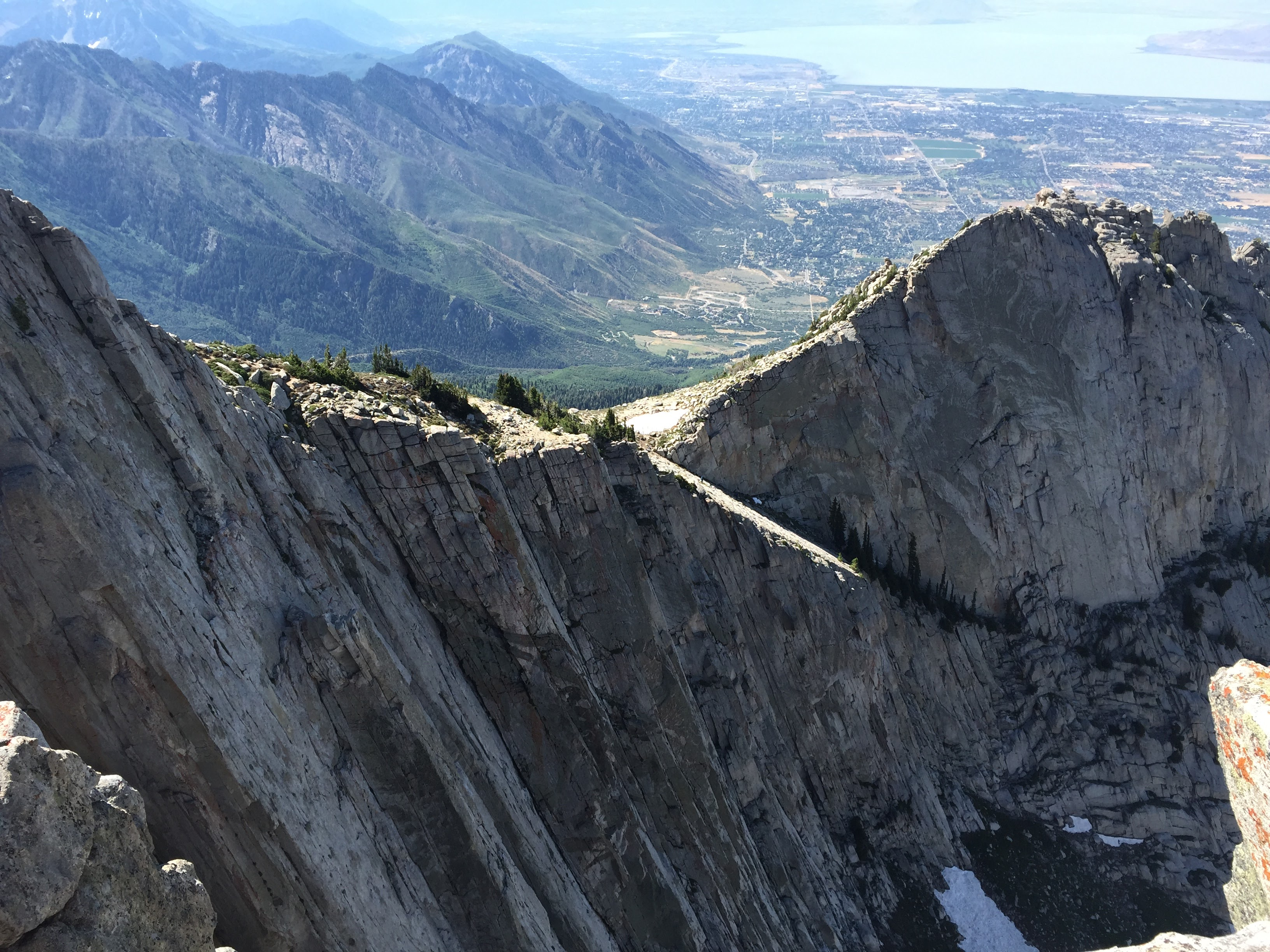
View towards Utah Valley and Utah Lake

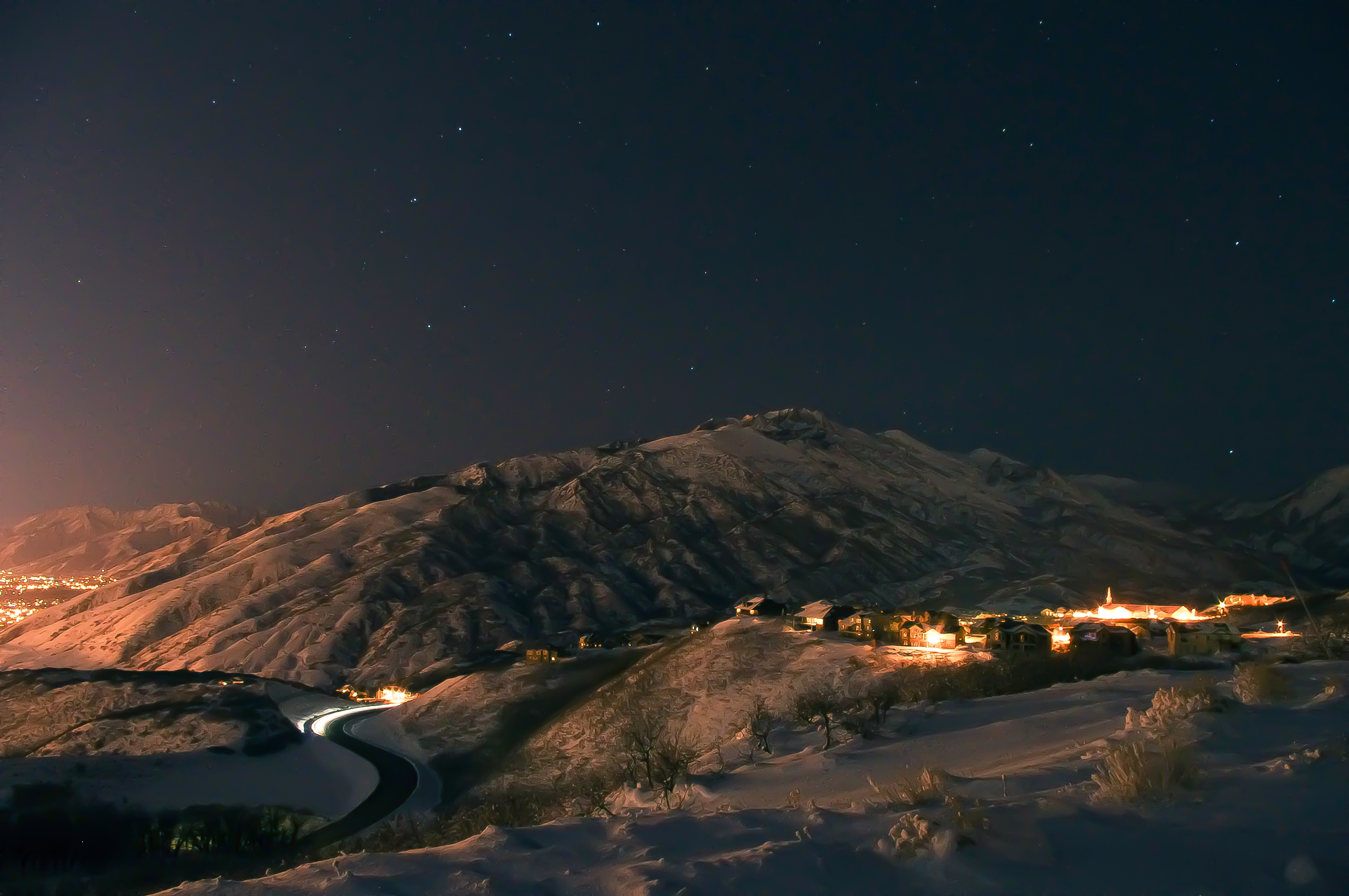
Lone Peak from Salt Lake Valley at night

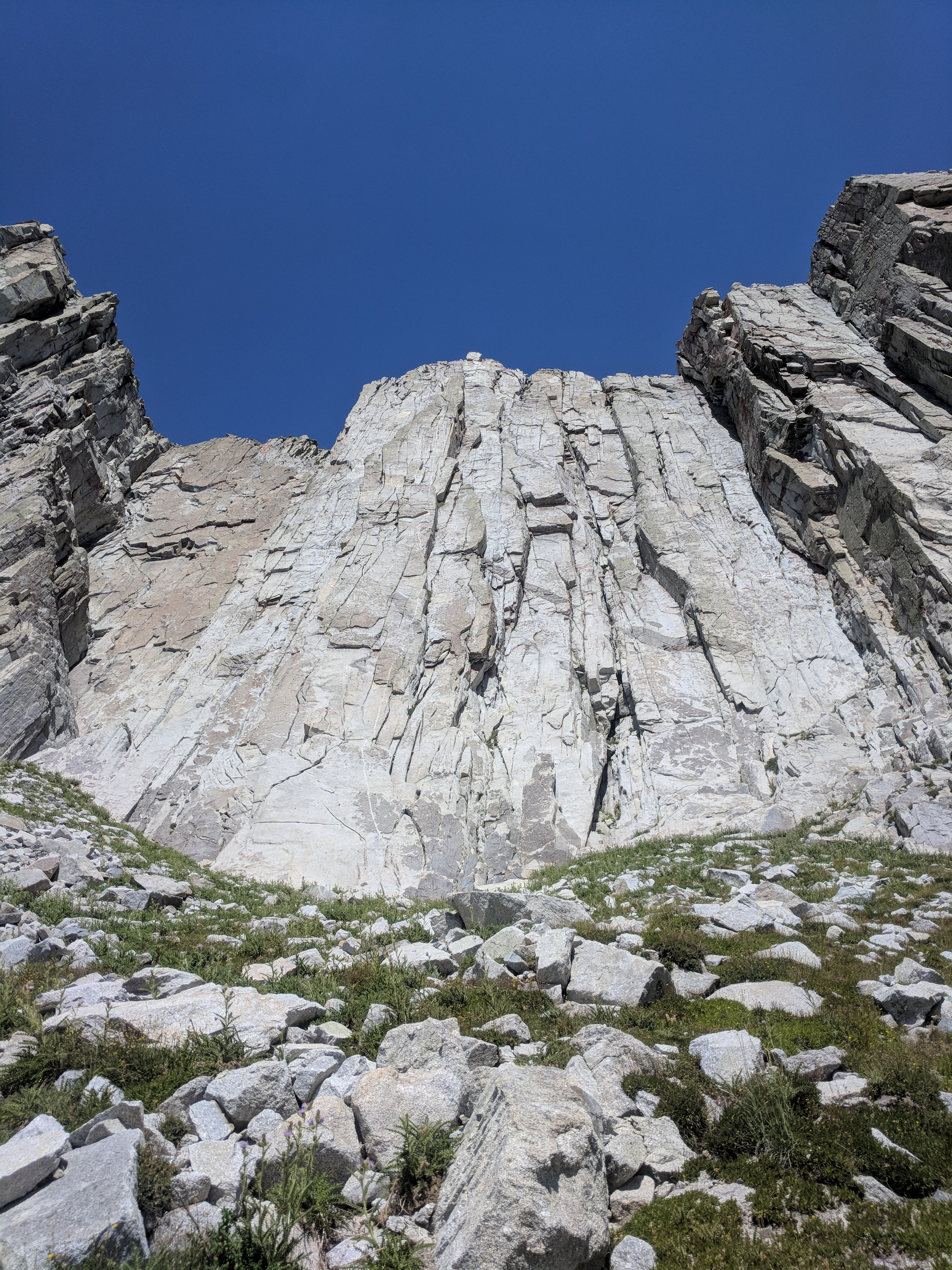
The south summit wall of Lone Peak
