= Robert H. Adleman =

American novelist and historian

Robert H. Aldeman
- Born: May 7, 1919; Philadelphia, Pennsylvania, U.S.
- Died: November 16, 1995 (aged 76); Ashland, Oregon, U.S.
- Occupations: Novelist, historian
- Children: 2
- Writing career
- Notable work: The Devil's Brigade

Robert H. Adleman (May 7, 1919 – November 16, 1995) was an American novelist and historian. His book Devil's Brigade, about World War II, was turned into a film in 1968.

== Biography ==
Adleman was born in Philadelphia, Pennsylvania. A photographer and tail gunner in the Army Air Forces during World War II, he became a businessman and a historian, and began a collaboration with U.S. Army Colonel George Walton to write books about World War II, the most successful of which was 1966's The Devil's Brigade. A story about the 1st Special Service Force nicknamed the "Devil's Brigade", the book would be turned into a motion picture of the same name in 1968 and starred William Holden and Cliff Robertson.

Adleman was co-owner and president of Robinson, Adleman, and Montgomery, a Philadelphia public relations and advertising firm. An innovator, he constantly started new ventures including publishing of "The Record-Breeze and Mall Journal newspapers; produced forerunner of "Today" TV show, "Modern Living", and chain of fast food restaurants, "Take Out Kitchens" and "Hush Puppy House." He also owned the Bessie V. Hicks School of Dramatic Arts. Graduates included Jeanette MacDonald, Charles Bronson, and Bruce Dern.

After selling the movie rights, Adleman and his wife moved from Philadelphia to Malibu, California. They remained there for a number of years until they acquired a large ranch property in Oregon. At which point they opened the restaurant The Bella Union, featuring the "peach baboo", a cocktail named after their grandson's childhood treat. Adleman died in Ashland, Oregon, in 1995. His wife and two daughters scattered his ashes on the ocean at the beach in Malibu.

== Selected bibliography ==
- The Devil's Brigade (1966) (written with Col. George Walton)
- Rome Fell Today (1968) (written with Col. George Walton)
- The Champagne Campaign (1969) (written with Col. George Walton)
- The Bloody Benders (1970)
- Annie Deane (1971)
- What's Really Involved in Writing and Selling Your Book (1972)
- The Black Box (1973)
- Alias Big Cherry: The Confessions of a Master Criminal (1973)
- Sweetwater Fever (1986)
