= Berets of the United States Army =

Traditional headgear of the U.S. Army

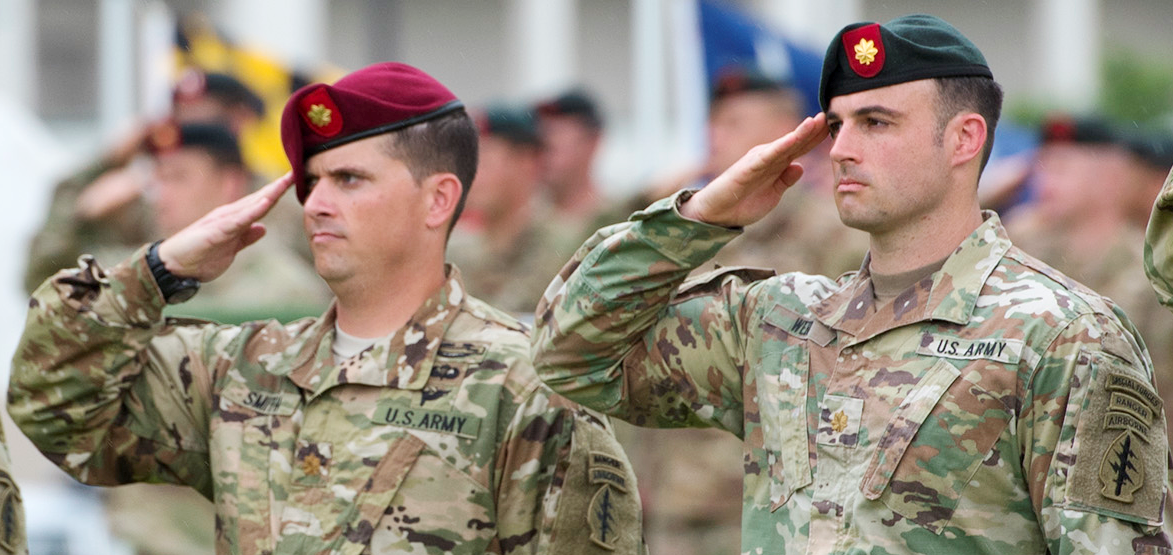
Two officers assigned to the 7th Special Forces Group (Airborne), one wearing a maroon beret (non-special forces qualified) and the other a green beret (special forces qualified), participate in a change of command ceremony at Eglin Air Force Base (2017)

The United States Army has used military berets as headgear with various uniforms beginning in World War II. Since June 14, 2001, a black beret is worn by all U.S. Army troops unless the soldier is approved to wear a different distinctive beret. A maroon beret has been adopted as official headdress by the Airborne forces, a tan beret by the 75th Ranger Regiment, a brown beret by the Security Force Assistance Brigades, and a green beret by the Special Forces.

In 2011, the Army replaced the black wool beret with the patrol cap as the default headgear for the Army Combat Uniform.

In 2019, the Army proposed the creation of a new grey beret for USASOC soldiers qualified in psychological operations (PSYOP), but has yet to receive its official approval. In the meantime, grey berets are only issued to Army Junior ROTC cadets.

== Black ==
The black beret was worn by various reconnaissance, ranger, and armored units in the 1960s and 70s. Today, the black beret is worn by regular soldiers of the U.S. Army.

In 1975, the black beret was officially authorized for wear by the newly created battalions of United States Army Rangers who had worn it unofficially during the Vietnam War. Also in 1975, a unique black beret was authorized for wear by female soldiers but was of a different design than the one worn by male soldiers.

In 2001, the black beret became the primary headgear for both the service uniform (in garrison setting) and dress uniform for all United States Army troops unless the soldier is approved to wear a different distinctive beret. In 2011, the Army changed back to the patrol cap for primary wear with the utility uniform, with the beret remaining the headgear for the dress uniform.

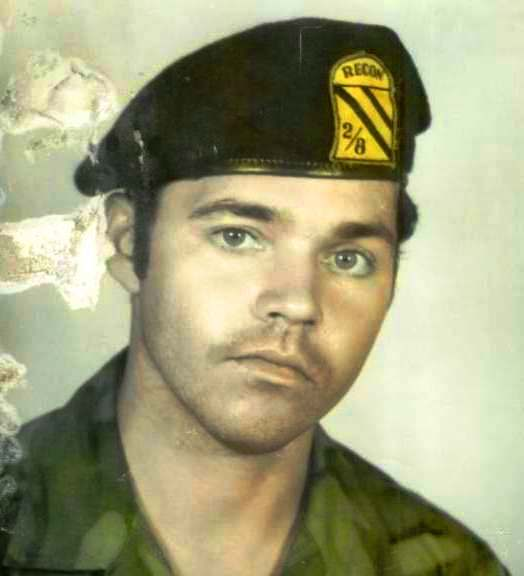
A US Army infantryman with the 1st Cavalry Division, 1st Brigade, 2nd Battalion, 8th Cavalry, Reconnaissance Platoon wearing black beret with platoon beret flash (1970)

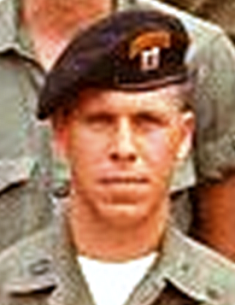
US Army Ranger School Class 11-71 commander wearing black beret with his Ranger Tab and rank insignia (1971)

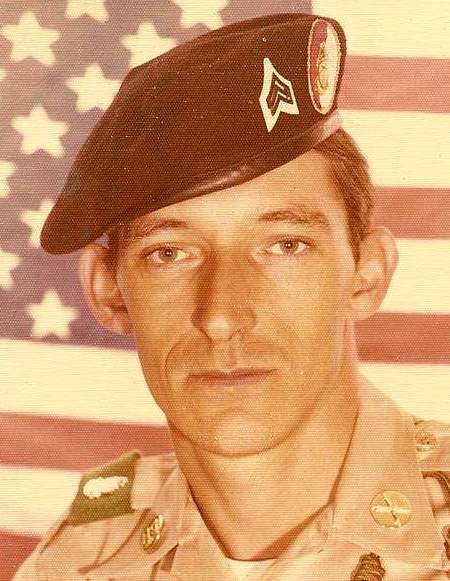
A U.S. Army non-commissioned officer with the 11th Armored Cavalry wearing black beret with Armored Cavalry Oval, Distinctive Unit Insignia (DUI), and rank insignia (c. 1973-1974)

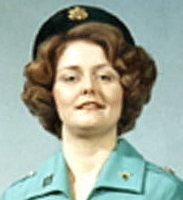
A US Army Medical Corps officer wearing black female beret with Officer Cap Device (c. 1975)

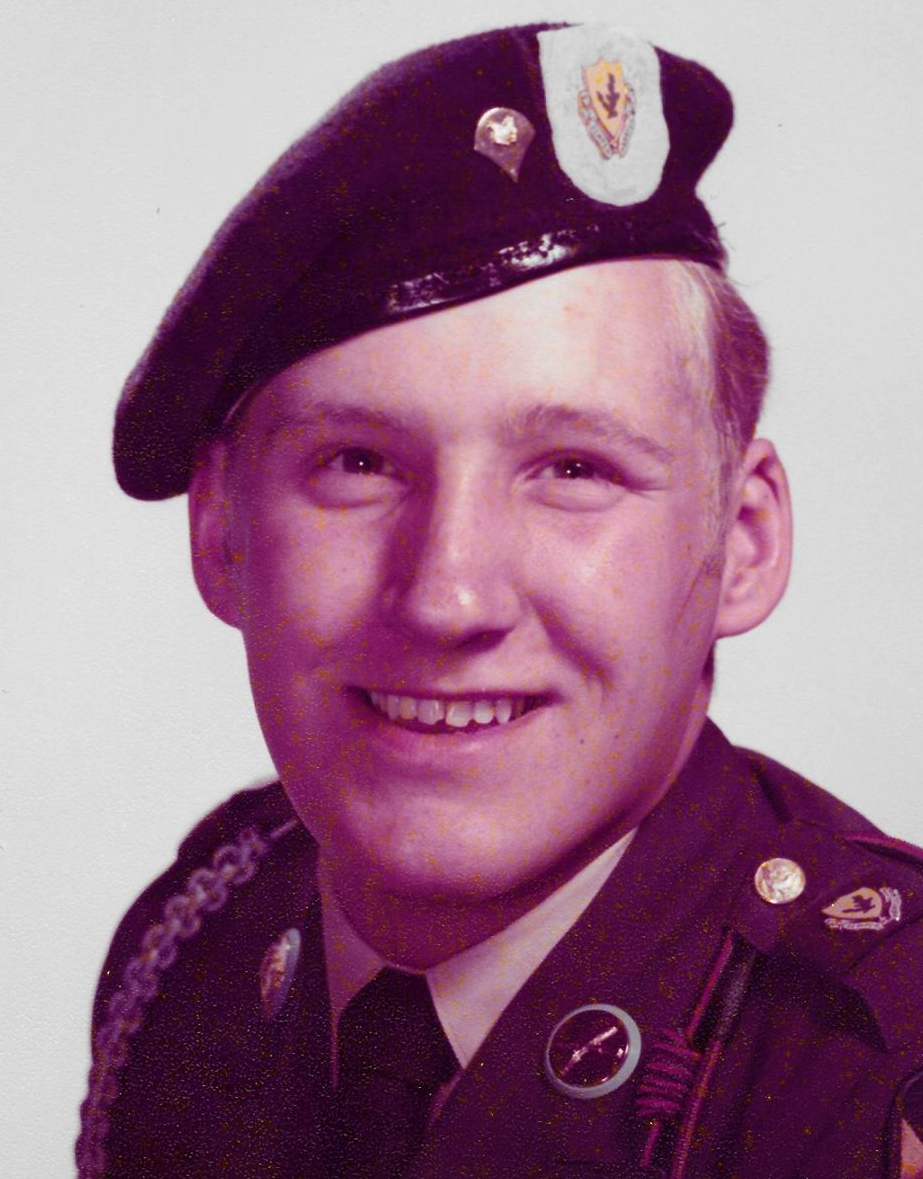
An infantryman with 1st Cavalry Division, 1st Brigade, 1st Battalion, 12th Cavalry wearing black beret with unit beret flash, DUI, and rank insignia (1976)

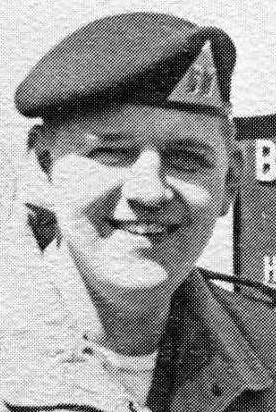
An armor officer with the US Army Armor School wearing black beret with Armor School Instructor Flash and rank insignia (1976)

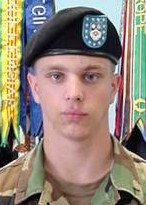
A soldier with 2nd Infantry Division, 3rd Stryker Brigade Combat Team, 1st Battalion, 23rd Infantry wearing black beret with Department of the Army Beret Flash and DUI (c. 2001)

== Brown ==
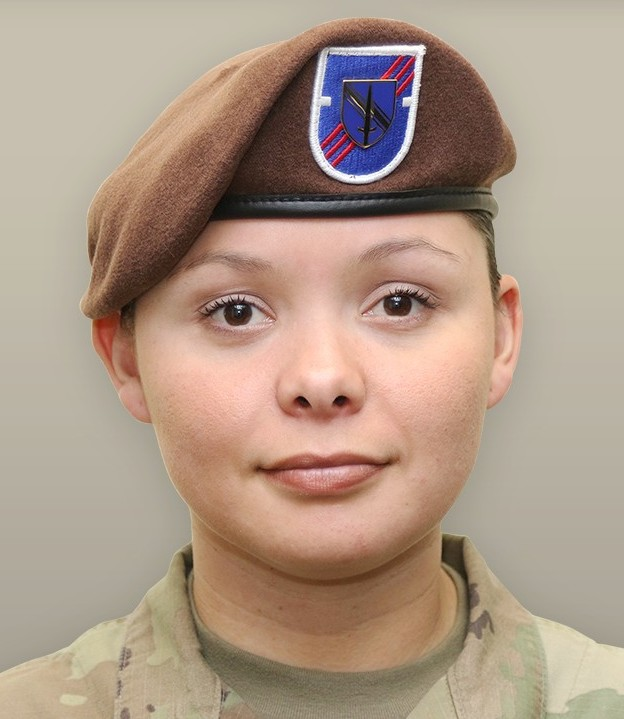
A soldier from the 1st SFAB wearing a brown beret (2018)

The brown beret was created in 2018 for soldiers of the U.S. Army's then-new Security Force Assistance Command and its brigades or SFABs. Soldiers assigned to the command and its brigades are authorized to wear the brown beret—with a brigade specific beret flash and DUI—to recognize these new specialized units, whose core mission is to conduct training, advising, assisting, enabling, and accompanying operations with allied and partner nations. According to an official U.S. Army article, "SFAB soldiers will be on the ground with their partners - fighting side-by-side with them in all conditions, so the brown beret symbolizes dirt or mud akin to the 'muddy boots' moniker given to leaders who are always out with the troops."

== Maroon ==
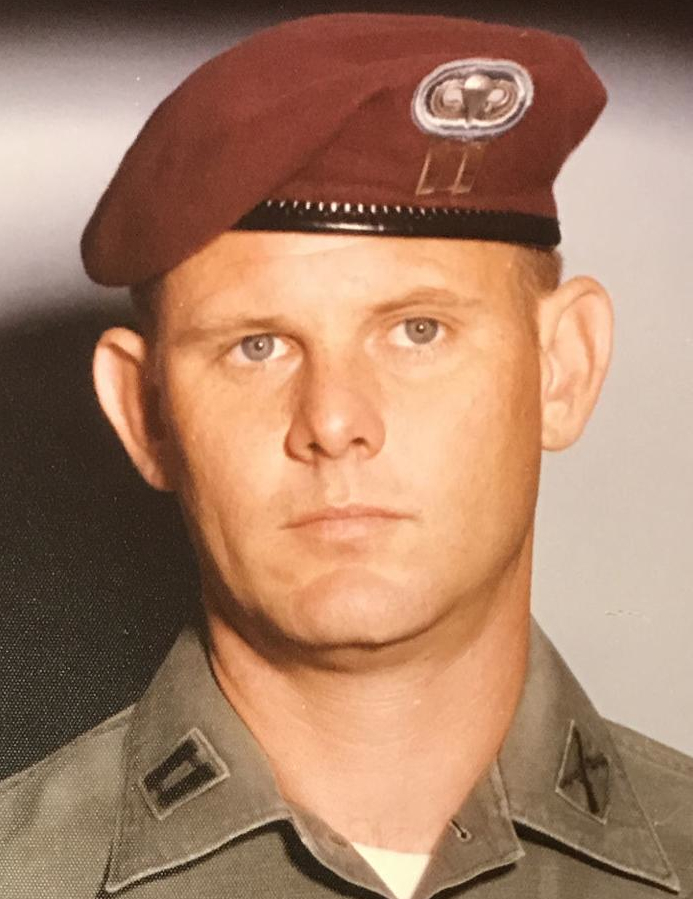
A Captain from the Army Infantry School's Airborne Department wearing the maroon beret (c. 1973)

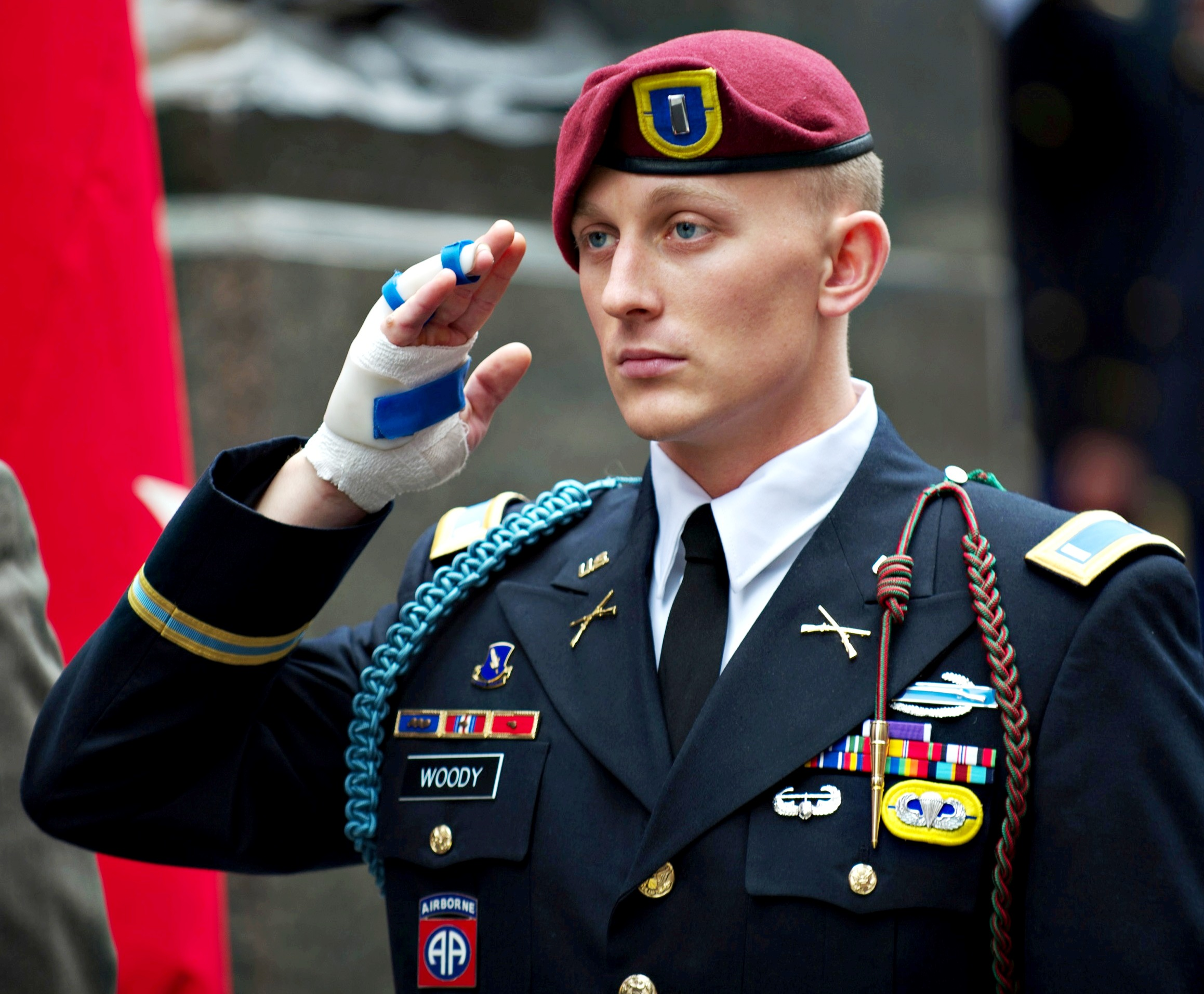
A 1LT with 1st Battalion, 504th Infantry Regiment, 82nd Airborne Division wearing the maroon beret (2012)

In 1943 General Frederick Browning, commander of the British First Airborne Corps, granted the U.S. Army's 509th Parachute Infantry Battalion honorary membership in the British Parachute Regiment and authorized them to wear British-style maroon berets. During the Vietnam War, U.S. military advisers to Vietnamese airborne units often wore the Vietnamese French-style red beret.

With the Department of the Army policy in 1973 permitting local commanders to encourage morale-enhancing distinctions, airborne forces began to wear the maroon beret as their mark of distinction. This permission was rescinded in 1979 when the army Chief of Staff, General Edward C. Meyer, required all units to adhere to the uniform regulation. On 28 November 1980, updated uniform regulations authorized airborne (parachute) units to resume wearing the maroon beret. In the interim, airborne units wore the Hot Weather Cap (olive-drab hats resembling a baseball cap) with their parachutist badge and airborne background trimming affixed above their rank insignia with the combat uniform and the Airborne Insignia on the garrison cap with the service dress uniform.

"The French Hat" (History of the beret in the US Army, from the perspective of the 82nd Airborne Division)

== Tan ==
A Ranger from 3rd Battalion, 75th Ranger Regiment wearing tan beret (c. 2017)

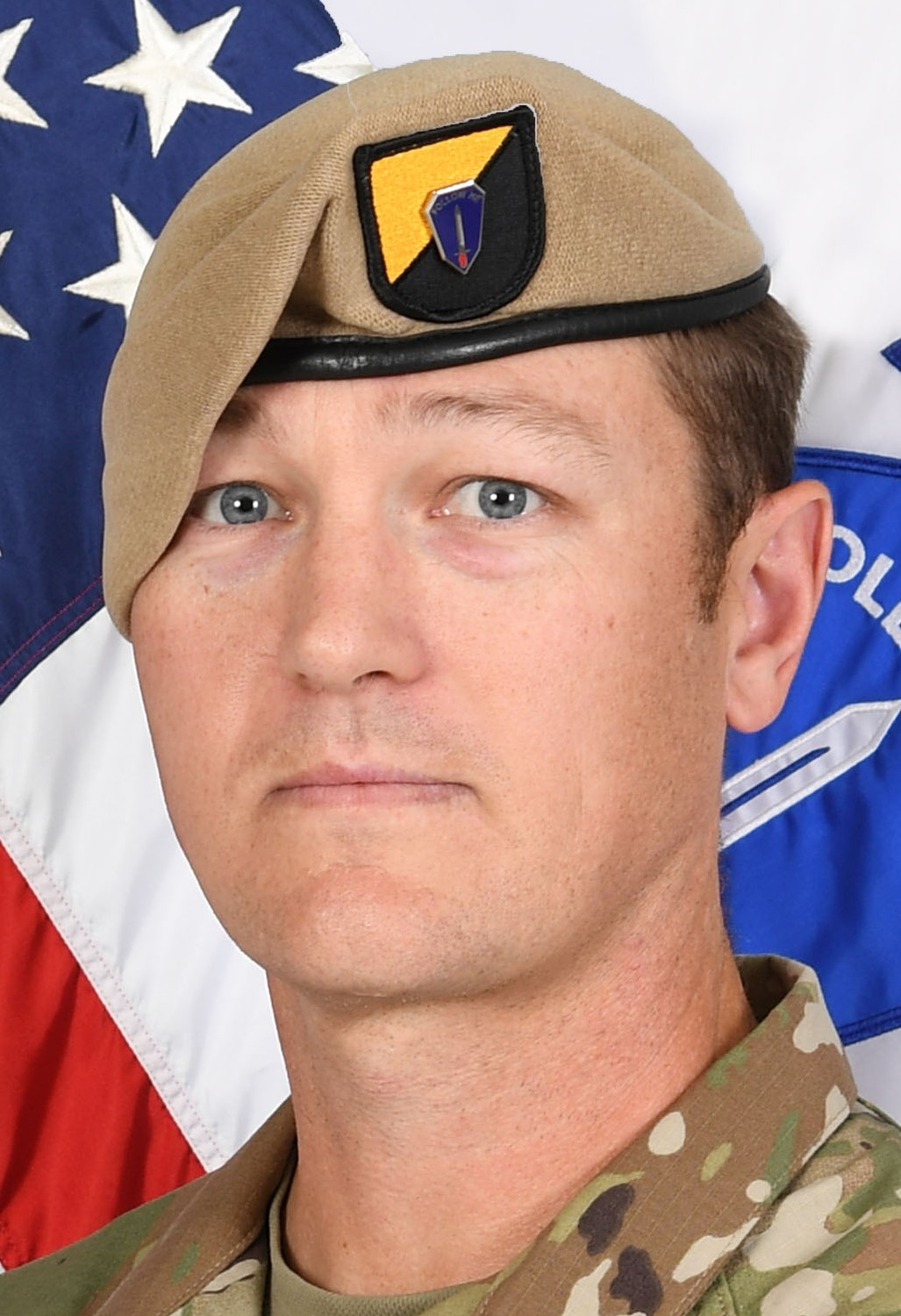
A Ranger from the Army Infantry School, Airborne and Ranger Training Brigade wearing tan beret (2024)

On 14 June 2001, U.S. Army Rangers units—such as the 75th Ranger Regiment and the Airborne and Ranger Training Brigade—were authorized to wear the distinctive tan beret to replace the black beret that had become the U.S. Army-wide standard. The color was chosen by the members of the 75th Ranger Regiment as being similar to other elite units with similar missions, notably the British, Australian, and New Zealand Special Air Service.

== Green ==
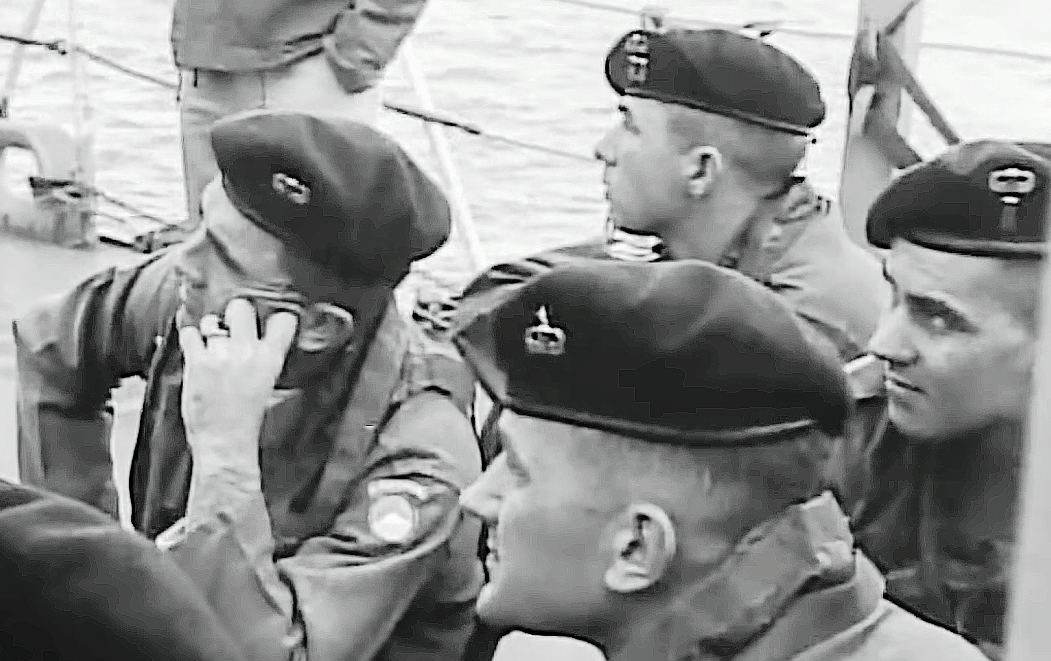
A special forces detachment from 8231st Army Unit, U.S. Army Japan prepare for a combat dive operation near Okinawa, Japan in 1956, wearing their green berets prior to their approved wear in 1961 (c. 1956)

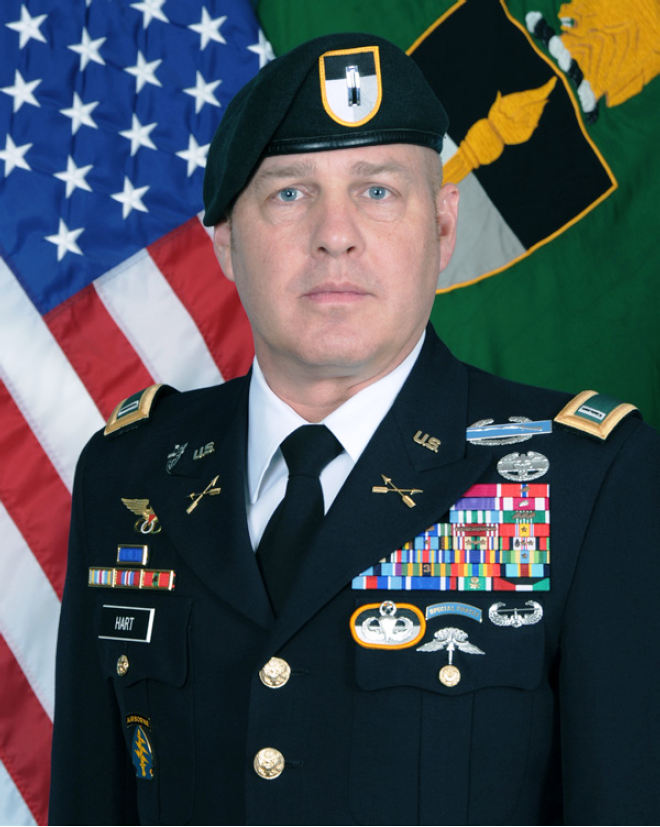
JFK Special Warfare Center and School's Command Chief Warrant Officer wearing his green beret (c. 2018)

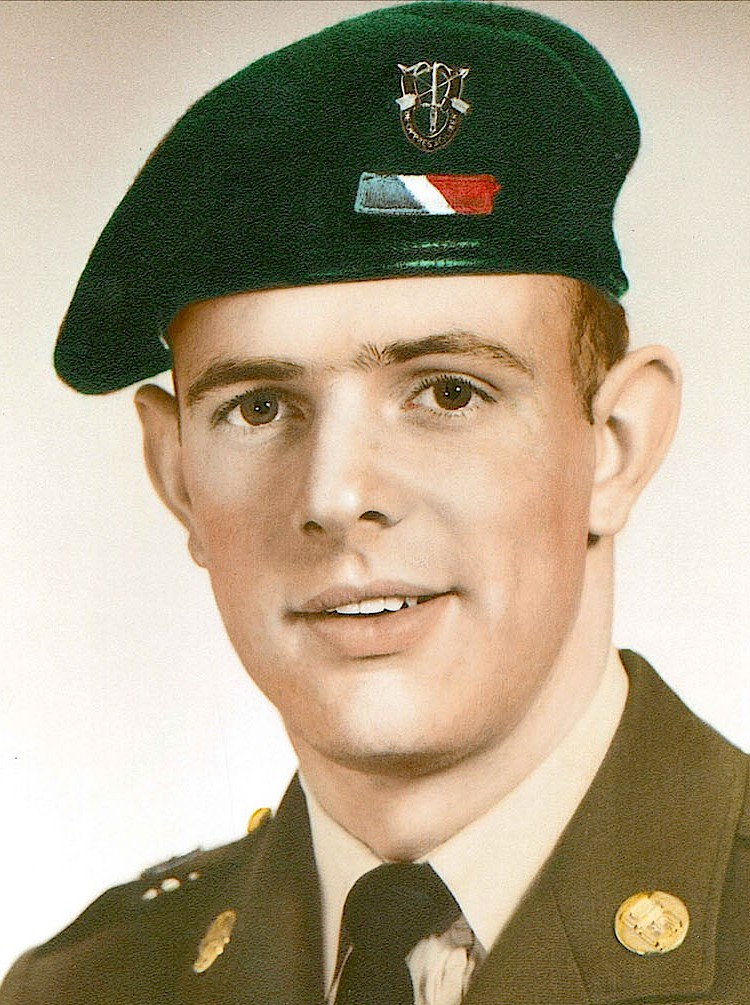
A non-special forces qualified combat medic assigned to the 11th SFG —as indicated by the recognition bar on his beret—wearing the special forces organizational green beret (c. 1967)

In the United States Army, the green beret may be worn only by soldiers who have graduated from the Special Forces Qualification Course, signifying, along with the Special Forces Tab, they are Special Forces qualified paratroopers.

The 10th Special Forces Group (Airborne) (SFG) had many veterans of World War II and Korea in its ranks when it was formed in 1952. Members of the 10th SFG began to unofficially wear a variety of berets while training, some favoring the red or maroon airborne beret, the black beret, or the British Commando green beret. In 1953, a beret whose design was based on that of the Canadian Army pattern, and which was rifle-green in color, was chosen for wear by Special Forces units.

Their new headgear was first worn at a retirement parade at Fort Bragg on 12 June 1955 for Lt. Gen. Joseph P. Cleland, the now-former commander of the XVIII Airborne Corps. Onlookers thought that the commandos were a foreign delegation from NATO.

In 1956 Gen. Paul D. Adams, the post commander at Fort Bragg, North Carolina, banned its wear, even though it was worn on the sly when units were in the field or deployed overseas. This was reversed on 25 September 1961 by Department of the Army Message 578636, which designated the green beret as the exclusive headgear of the Army Special Forces.

When visiting the Special Forces at Fort Bragg on 12 October 1961, President John F. Kennedy asked Brig. Gen. William P. Yarborough to make sure that the men under his command wore green berets for the visit. Later that day, Kennedy sent a memorandum that included the line: "I am sure that the green beret will be a mark of distinction in the trying times ahead". By America's entry into the Vietnam War, the green beret had become a symbol of excellence throughout the U.S. Army. On 11 April 1962 in a White House memorandum to the United States Army, President Kennedy reiterated his view: "The green beret is a symbol of excellence, a badge of courage, a mark of distinction in the fight for freedom". Previously, both Yarborough and Edson Raff had petitioned the Pentagon to allow wearing of the green beret, to no avail.

Between 1961 and 1993, the green beret was worn by all paratroopers assigned to a special forces unit as an organizational piece of headgear. Special forces qualified paratroopers would wear their unit's organizational beret flash on their green beret while non-special forces qualified support paratroopers wore a recognition bar, helping to denote the different type of paratroopers assigned to a special forces unit. In 1993, the Chief of Staff of the Army, General Gordon R. Sullivan, restricted the wear of the green beret to only special forces qualified paratroopers. Due to this policy change, special forces support paratroopers wear the maroon beret with their special forces unit's organizational beret flash.

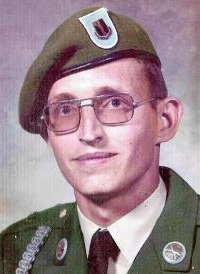
An arctic–qualified infantryman with 1st Bn, 60th Inf. RGT, 172nd Inf. BDE wearing olive-drab beret (c. 1970s)

During the 1970s, arctic–qualified soldiers of the 172nd Infantry Brigade wore locally authorized olive–drab green berets with organizational beret flashes that were unique to each battalion, company, troop, or battery of the brigade. By 1979, the Army put a stop to the use of berets by conventional forces, leaving only special forces and ranger units the authority to wear berets.

== See also ==
- United States military beret flash
- Military beret
- Headgear of the United States Army
