= 473rd Regiment =

473rd Regiment may refer to:

- 473rd Infantry Regiment, United States
- 473rd (Mobile) Heavy Anti-Aircraft Regiment, Royal Artillery (North Midland)
