= William P. Yarborough =

United States Army general (1912–2005)

William Pelham Yarborough
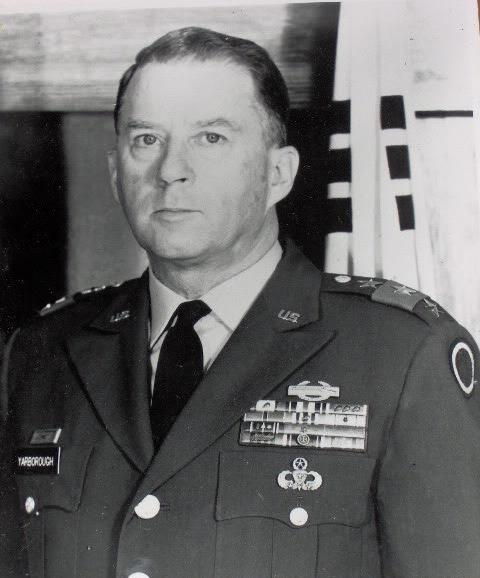
- Born: May 12, 1912; Seattle, Washington, United States
- Died: December 6, 2005 (aged 93); Southern Pines, North Carolina, United States
- Burial place: Arlington National Cemetery, Virginia, United States SECTION 4 GRAVESITE 3099-D
- Military career
- Allegiance: United States
- Branch: United States Army
- Service years: 1931–1971
- Rank: Lieutenant General
- Nickname: "Father of the Modern Green Berets"
- Service number: 0-202362
- Unit: Infantry Branch
- Commands: 2nd Battalion, 504th Parachute Infantry Regiment; 509th Parachute Infantry Battalion; 473rd Infantry Regimental Combat Team; 1st Battle Group, 7th Infantry Regiment; 66th Counterintelligence Corps Group; United States Army Special Warfare Center/School for Special Warfare; I Corps
- Conflicts: World War II
- Awards: Army Distinguished Service Medal; Silver Star; Legion of Merit with 3 oak leaves Bronze Star; Italian Bronze Medal of Military Valor; Italian Cross for Valor; French Croix de Guerre with Palm; Eulji Order of Military Merit

Lieutenant General William Pelham Yarborough (May 12, 1912 – December 6, 2005) was a senior United States Army officer. Yarborough designed the U.S. Army's parachutist badge, paratrooper or 'jump' boots, and the M42 airborne jump uniform. He is known as the "Father of the Modern Green Berets." He was descended from the Yorkshire House of Yarborough. Yarborough was a distant cousin to such British noble figures as the Baron Deramore, Lord Alvingham, the Duke of Buccleuch and the Marquess of Bath.

== Early life ==
William Pelham Yarborough was born May 12, 1912, in Seattle, Washington. He is the son of Colonel Leroy W. and Addessia Yarborough. He attended high school at San Rafael Military Academy in California and later at Columbus, Georgia. In 1931, Yarborough enlisted in the United States Army, obtaining an appointment to the U.S. Military Academy a year later in 1932. At his graduation from West Point in June 1936 Yarborough was sworn in as a second lieutenant by General of the Armies John Joseph Pershing. He was assigned to the 57th Infantry Regiment, Philippine Scouts at Fort McKinley, Luzon where he remained until February 1940, when he was transferred to the 29th Infantry Regiment at Fort Benning, Georgia. He volunteered for the airborne forces and joined the newly formed 501st Parachute Battalion in late 1940 and was given command of Company "C". Later, as Test Officer for the Provisional Parachute Group in 1941, he designed the paratrooper's boot, the paratrooper's uniform, the parachutist badge and airborne background trimming, and a number of aerial delivery containers for which he received U. S. patents.

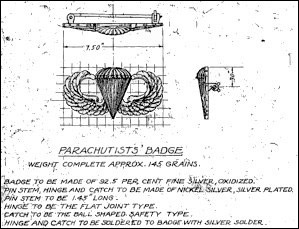
Original sketch for the parachutist badge, by William P. Yarborough (Patent #134963)

Example of the first parachutist
badge and first airborne background
trimming, designed for the 501st
Parachute Battalion during WWII.

Yarborough first met his future wife, Norma Tuttle Yarborough (1918–1999), when she was 12 and he was 18. At the time, they were neighbors when their fathers were stationed at Fort Benning. They became reacquainted when the two families were next door neighbors at Plattsburgh Barracks in New York. The future Mrs. Yarborough studied under Karl Menninger at Washburn University when her father was assigned to Fort Leavenworth. In 1936 she was crowned "Miss Topeka."

== World War II ==
In July 1942, seven months after the United States entered World War II, due to the Japanese attack on Pearl Harbor, Yarborough, now a major, was selected by Major General Mark W. Clark to be his Airborne Advisor and in that capacity accompanied him to England. As a working member of the London Planning Group, he developed the initial concept and plan for the airborne phase of the Allied invasion of North Africa, codenamed Operation Torch. When the Paratroop Task Force departed Land's End, England on November 7, 1942, Yarborough, as executive officer (XO), accompanied it on its flight over Spain toward its target objectives in Algeria. This was the longest operational flight ever made by parachute troops. In the course of the ensuing action the airplane in which he was flying was shot down by Vichy French fighter aircraft over the Sebkra d'Oran. He participated in combat operations to capture Tafaroui Airdrome in Algeria. A week later, Yarborough parachuted into Youks les Bains Airfield near Tebessa, Algeria (near the Tunisian border) and fighting as part of a combined French and U.S. Paratroop Task Force in Tunisia until January 1943, when he returned to the United States.

In March 1943, Yarborough returned to North Africa as Commanding Officer (CO) of the 2nd Battalion, 504th Parachute Infantry Regiment, under Colonel Reuben H. Tucker, itself part of the 82nd Airborne Division, commanded by Major General Matthew Ridgway. Yarborough, promoted to lieutenant colonel in May, led his battalion throughout the Allied invasion of Sicily, Operation Husky. Following a disastrous ambush by Italian forces at Tumminello Pass, Yarborough was relieved of his command by Major General Ridgway. Mark Clark, now a lieutenant general commanding the American Fifth Army, then had him assigned to his staff. During the Allied invasion of Italy in September Yarborough served as the airborne G-3 staff officer of the Fifth Army, and organized the night drop zone to receive the latest elements of the 82nd Airborne Division, which had flown from Sicily to relieve the beleaguered beachhead at Salerno.

Just prior to the fall of the Italian city and port of Naples, Yarborough was given command of the 509th Parachute Infantry Battalion, whose CO, Major Doyle Yardley, had been captured. His unit, as part of Colonel William O. Darby's Ranger Force, made the initial landings at Anzio-Neptune in January 1944 and held a key position on the beachhead for the next two months. Later, after being relieved at Anzio, under his command the 509th, and two attached parachute battalions, spearheaded the Allied landings in southern France, landing on a mountaintop near Le Muy before dawn. Cannes, Nice and Monte Carlo along the Côte d'Azur fell to the parachutists who then turned northward into the Maritime Alps to protect the right flank of Lieutenant General Alexander Patch's U.S. Seventh Army as it moved north.

Yarborough returned briefly to the United States to attend the 21st course of the U.S. Army Command and General Staff School at Fort Leavenworth, Kansas. He returned to Italy in January 1945 as CO of the 473rd Regimental Combat Team, who had previously been antiaircraft gunners. The 473rd serving in the Italian Campaign, which, during Operation Grapeshot, fought its way up the Ligurian Coast to Genoa and the French border as World War II came to an end. It was during this campaign that he was awarded the Silver Star.

== Service in Europe, US, and Cambodia ==
In June 1945 the 473d Infantry Regiment was deactivated and Yarborough, remaining in Europe, was named as Provost Marshal; first of the 15th Army Group, and later of the U.S. Forces in Austria and the Vienna Area Command. In the latter position he organized the famous Four Power International Patrol of Russian, French, British, and American military police.

From 1947 to 1949 Yarborough served as Director of the Department of Troop Information and Education at the Armed Forces Information School, Carlisle Barracks, Pennsylvania. In 1950 he returned to Europe for the third time to attend the British Staff College at Camberley, England. Upon graduation he was assigned to the NATO Plans Section of the Joint American Military Advisory Group to Europe, stationed in London. He entered the United States Army War College as a student in 1952 and after graduation served on its faculty for three years.

In 1956 he became Deputy Chief of the U. S. Military Advisory and Assistance Group to Cambodia. He remained in this assignment until he returned to the U.S. Army War College for a temporary tour prior to assuming command of the 1st Battle Group, 7th Infantry at Fort Benning, Georgia, later moving it to Aschaffenburg, Germany. Leaving the Battle Group in 1958, he commanded the 66th Counterintelligence Corps Group in Stuttgart for two years until his reassignment to Fort Bragg, North Carolina.

== Commander of US Army Special Warfare Center ==
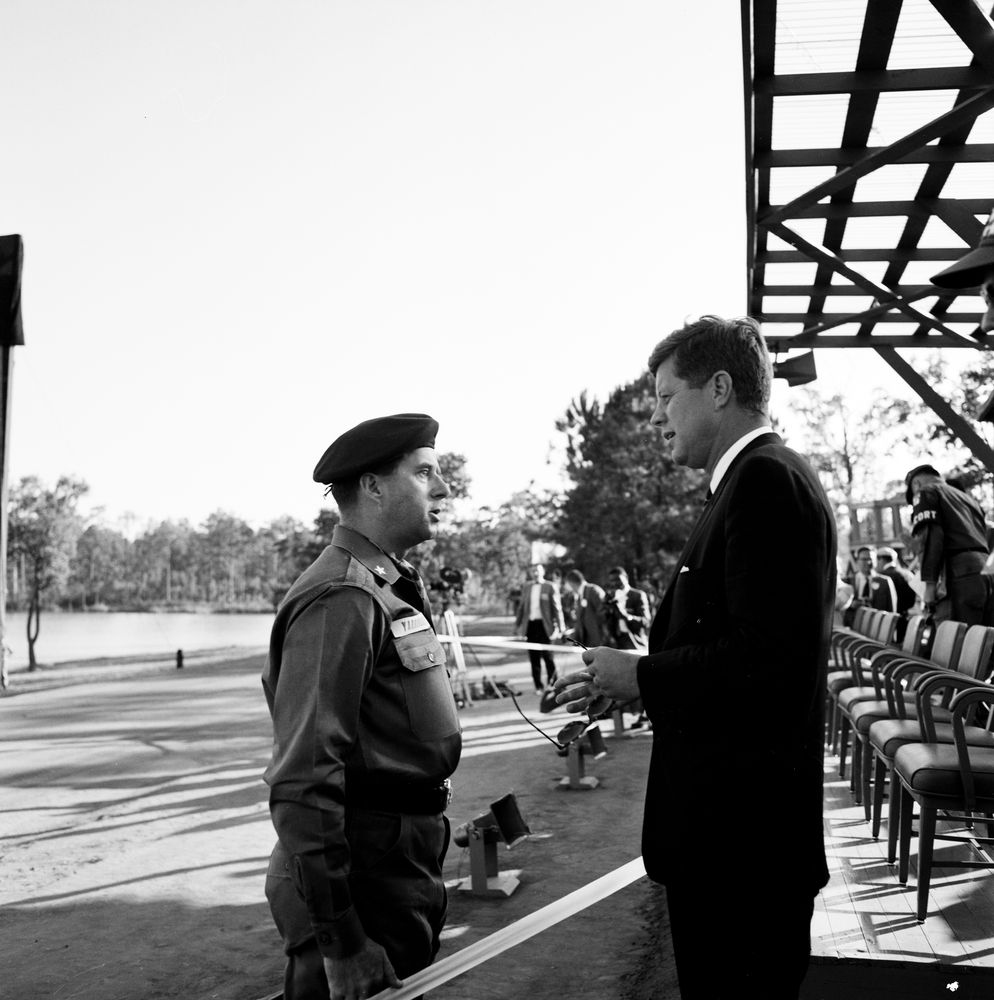
Then Brigadier General Yarborough meeting with President John F. Kennedy at Ft Bragg, October 12, 1961.

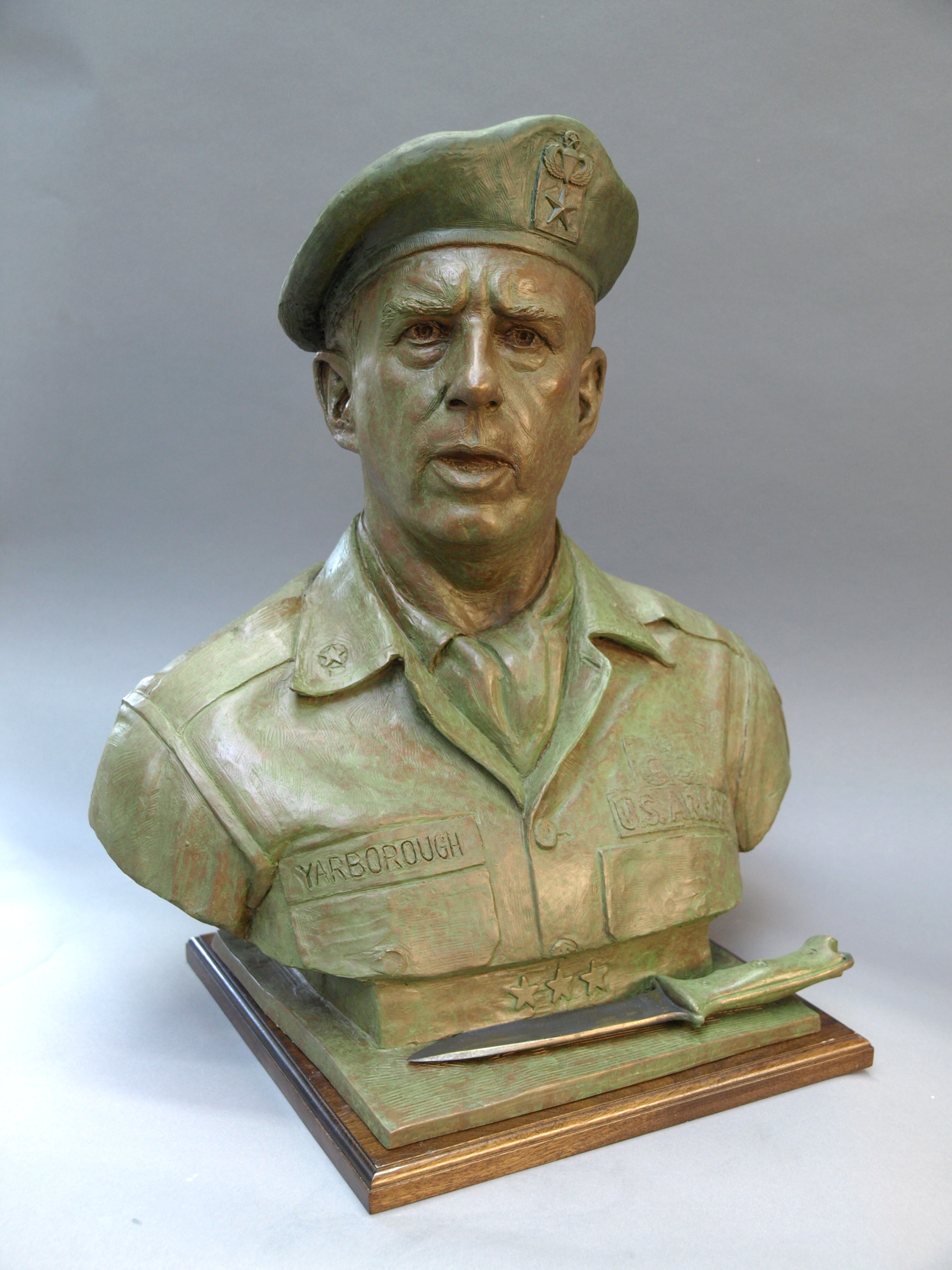
Bust of Brigadier General Yarborough

In January 1961, he was appointed commander/commandant of the US Army Special Warfare Center/School for Special Warfare at Fort Bragg, North Carolina. Remaining until 1965, he was instrumental in the build-up of Special Forces, overseeing the activation of four new Groups. He also worked diligently to increase the professional and academic standard of the JFK School, bringing in national figures in anthropology, history, science, and inviting leading political figures to speak. He initiated an exhaustive review of training programs and doctrine, and wrote numerous monographs on subjects pertaining to Special Operations, which are still relevant today. It was also under his management that foreign students were fully integrated into training and language instruction was expanded. He established five new courses including the Military Assistance Training Advisor School, the Unconventional Warfare course and the Counter-Terrorism course. He also initiated a staff study that later resulted in the movement of the US Army Civil Affairs School from Fort Gordon, Georgia to Fort Bragg.

It was during his tenure as Commander of the Special Warfare Center that in 1961, he arranged for President Kennedy to visit Fort Bragg, the results were twofold - acquiring the funding to further develop the Special Forces into a strategic unit within the US Army and the more visible sign - the authorization of the Green Beret for wear as the official headgear of Special Forces. Yarborough's design for the original parachutists uniform was incorporated into the 1963 Army tropical uniform that was later worn by all Army units in the Vietnam War.

=== Colombia ===
A Fort Bragg top-level U.S. Special Warfare team, headed by Special Warfare Center commander Yarborough, visited Colombia in February 1962. In a secret supplement to his report to the joint Chiefs of Staff, Yarborough encouraged a stay-behind irregular force and its immediate deployment to eliminate communists representing a future threat:

[A] concerted country team effort should be made now to select civilian and military personnel for clandestine training in resistance operations in case they are needed later. This should be done with a view toward development of a civil and military structure for exploitation in the event the Colombian internal security system deteriorates further. This structure should be used to pressure toward reforms known to be needed, perform counter-agent and counter-propaganda functions and as necessary execute paramilitary, sabotage and/or terrorist activities against known communist proponents. It should be backed by the United States.

Yarborough encouraged "an intensive civilian registration program ... so that [everyone] is eventually registered in government files together with fingerprints and photographs." Interrogation procedures and techniques, including regular questioning of rural villagers "who are believed to be knowledgeable of guerrilla activities" were advised. "Exhaustive interrogation of the bandits, to include sodium pentathol and polygraph, should be used to elicit every shred of information. Both the Army and the Police need trained interrogators." Pentathol was originally used by doctors for relaxation, but in the 1970s it was reported used by some Latin American militaries to induce "paralysis, agony, and terror."

"In general, the Yarborough team recommended that the US provide guidance and assistance in all aspects of counter-insurgency ... Civilian and military personnel, clandestinely selected and trained in resistance operations, would be required in order to develop an underground civil and military structure. This organization was to undertake 'clandestine execution of plans developed by the United States Government toward defined objectives in the political, economic, and military fields' ... it would ... undertake ... 'paramilitary, sabotage, and/or terrorist activities against known communist proponents'." Yarborough did not feel that this would be successful unless it were under U.S. command.

== Asian service ==
After his tenure at the Special Warfare School, he served as Senior Member, UN Command Military Armistice Commission, Panmunjom (1965.2.18~1965.10.5), Korea where he was the chief spokesman and negotiator for the UN Command in talks with the North Koreans and Chinese. He then was assigned as Assistant Deputy Chief of Staff for Special Operations in the Pentagon with the responsibility of all Special Forces, PSYOP and Civil Affairs units and activities. In this position, he completed exhaustive studies on the state of insurgencies in Thailand and Latin America. A year later, he became the Assistant Chief of Staff for Intelligence on the Army General Staff where he monitored the Army's intelligence training programs, provided finished intelligence materials to the Army General Staff and directed the Army's personnel security program. He also directed the programs in which foreign military attaches assigned to Washington were involved and was responsible for their accreditation by DA.

During the final years of his career, Yarborough was the Army's top intelligence officer at the Pentagon in Washington, D.C. He assumed the command of I Corps in Korea in 1968, a position he held for a year. I Corps consisted of both conventional and nuclear weapons, two American divisions and three Korean Divisions and a Korean Marine Corps Brigade, numbering approximately 100,000 men. In 1969, he was assigned as the Chief of Staff and Deputy Commander in Chief, U.S. Army Pacific, responsible for directing a wide variety of Army activities in the Pacific Rim, including planning joint training exercises, response to natural disasters and monitoring intelligence operations. He retired from the Army in 1971.

In 1971, the Army tasked him to prepare a classified Asian study on the state of the Asian continent after the Vietnam War. He also was a guest speaker for the National Strategy Information Center where he gave talks such as the Changing Balance of Military Power or the history of Special Forces to various groups around the country. He also was asked to visit various countries such as Rhodesia and Mozambique for the State Department. From his visits, he wrote various talking papers still in use today.

== Later life ==
Yarborough was a member of the Rotary and Kiwanis Clubs. He was also an honorary member of the British SAS Regiment and a member of the St. John's Lodge 260, F&AM. He wrote two books: Bail Out Over North Africa and So You Want A Volunteer Army. General Yarborough was married to his wife Norma for over 60 years. They had three children: 2 girls and one boy, LTC (Ret.) William Lee Yarborough, US Army. Mrs. Yarborough died in 1999.

Shortly before his death, Yarborough was honored on September 30, 2005, with the donation of a bust in his honor at the Airborne and Special Operations Museum in Fayetteville, North Carolina. In 2012, he and President John F. Kennedy were memorialized by a new statue at the U.S. Army John F. Kennedy Special Warfare Center and School at Fort Bragg. The statue was commissioned by Ross Perot.

A veteran of four combat jumps, General Yarborough holds, among other awards and decorations, the Distinguished Service Medal, Silver Star, Legion of Merit with three Oak Leaf Clusters, Bronze Star, Joint Services Commendation Medal, Italian Bronze Medal for Valor, Italian Cross for Valor, French Croix de Guerre with Palm, Regimental Badge 3d Zouaves, Korean Order of Merit Second Class, Combat Infantryman Badge, the Cambodian, Korean, Philippine, Thai and Vietnamese Parachutist Badges, and the Unit Citation with Oak Leaf Cluster.

Lieutenant General William P. Yarborough was buried in Arlington National Cemetery SECTION 4 SITE 3099-D.

The Yarborough knife made by Chris Reeve Knives and in collaboration with William Harsey Jr., awarded to all Special Forces Qualification Course graduates, is named for him.
