= Edson Raff =

Edson Duncan Raff
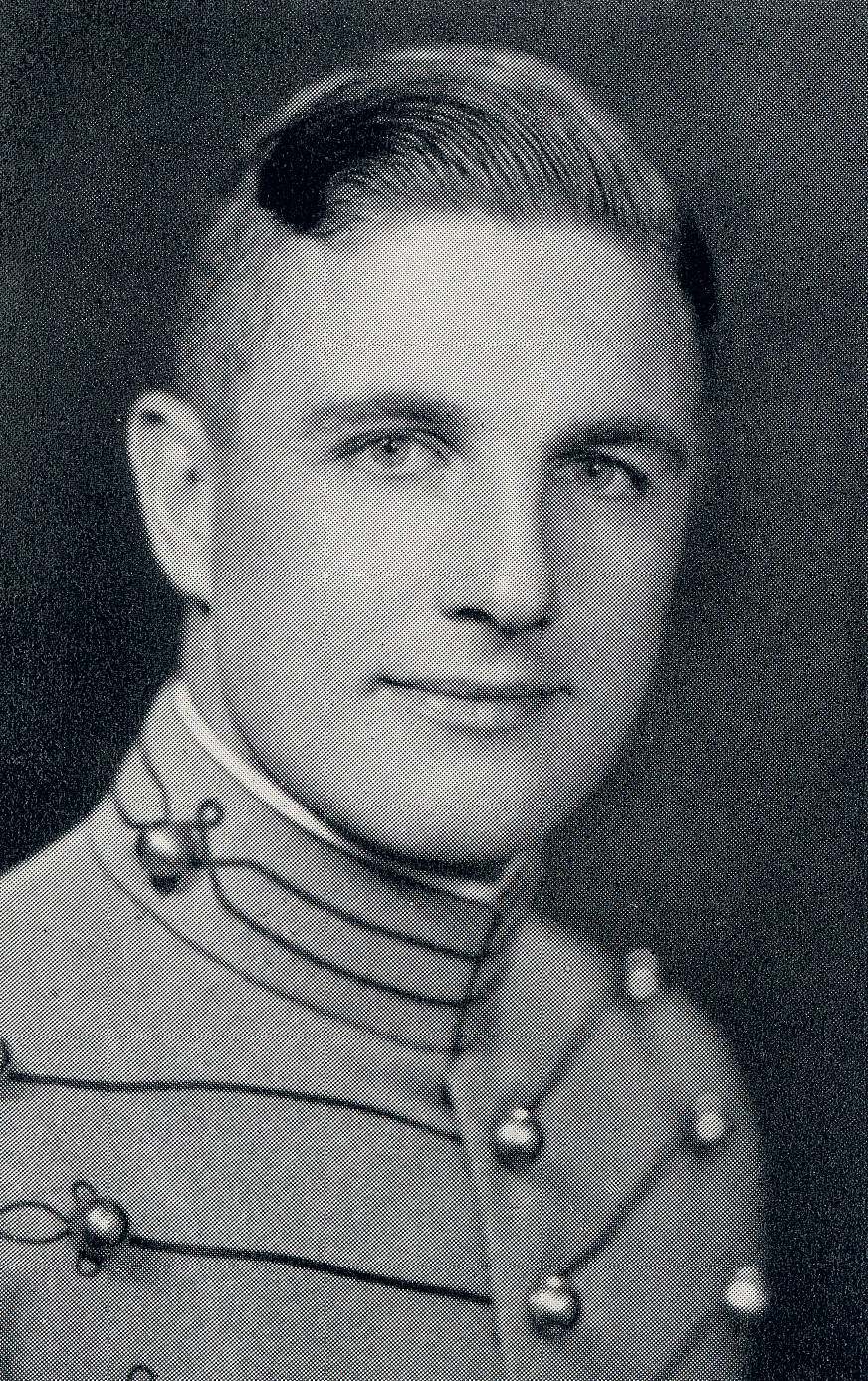
- Raff as a United States Military Academy cadet c. 1933
- Born: November 15, 1907; New York City, New York, United States
- Died: March 11, 2003 (aged 95); Garnett, Kansas, United States
- Military career
- Allegiance: United States
- Branch: United States Army
- Service years: 1933–1958
- Rank: Colonel
- Nickname: "Little Caesar"
- Service number: 0-19261
- Unit: Infantry Branch
- Commands: 2nd Battalion, 503rd Parachute Infantry Regiment; 507th Parachute Infantry Regiment; 7th Special Forces Group
- Conflicts: World War II
- Awards: Legion of Honour (France); Silver Star

Colonel Edson Duncan Raff (November 15, 1907 – March 11, 2003) was a United States Army officer and writer of a book on paratroopers. He served as Commanding Officer (CO) of the first American paratroop unit to jump into combat, the 2nd Battalion, 509th Parachute Infantry Regiment, near Oran as part of Operation Torch during World War II. His book, We Jumped to Fight, was based on his experience in that operation and was published in 1944.

== Early life and military career ==
Raff had served as First Captain of Cadets at a small prep school in Winchester, Virginia, called the Shenandoah Valley Academy, before serving in the army.

He graduated from the United States Military Academy (USMA) in 1933 as a second lieutenant into the Infantry Branch of the United States Army.

== World War II ==
By the time the United States entered World War II in December 1941, Raff had transferred to the army's fledgling airborne forces. Serving as Commanding Officer (CO) of the 2nd Battalion, 503rd Parachute Infantry Regiment, a paratrooper unit, commanded by Colonel William M. "Bud" Miley, Raff's battalion (which was later redesignated the 509th Parachute Infantry Battalion) was sent to England as an independent unit as part of Operation Roundup, the Allied invasion of German-occupied Europe scheduled for 1942 which, due to lack of resources, was postponed until 1943. While in England the 509th trained alongside and became closely associated with the British 1st Airborne Division, commanded by Major General Frederick A. M. "Boy" Browning, the father of the British Army's airborne forces.

Due to the tough training course he gave the paratroopers in the 509th (and his stocky physique), Raff was nicknamed "Little Caesar" by his paratroopers. He first saw combat in November 1942 in Operation Torch, the Allied invasion of French North Africa, as the commander of the 509th Parachute Infantry Battalion:

...the main force with Lieutenant Colonel Raff also jumped early some 35 miles east of the objective airfields. Although he broke several ribs in a hard landing, Lieutenant Colonel Raff continued to lead his paratroopers toward their objectives. After a full day and a night forced march, a company of weary paratroopers reached the airfield at Tafaraoui on the morning of November 9. Both airfields had already been captured by Allied amphibious forces. Thus ended the first and rather disappointing American Airborne combat operation in history.

On 13 November 1942, Raff led the 2nd Battalion, 509th Parachute Regiment in an airborne assault on the Youks-les-Bains airfield in Algeria meeting friendly and cooperative French forces. Raff then also captured Tebessa airfield. On 17 November, Raff led a small reconnaissance patrol that captured Gafsa, Tunisia and made contact with the friendly French Chasseurs d'Afrique Regiment and defenses were prepared around the airfield there. On 21 November, in the face of a German attack Raff destroyed the large aviation fuel dump at Gafsa and withdrew to Tebessa. Reinforced by a squadron of P-38s, Company I of the 2/509th and the 3rd Battalion Anti-tank Platoon, 26th Infantry as well as Company B, 701st Tank Destroyer Battalion Raff counterattacked and quickly recaptured Gafsa from a small German paratroop unit. Raff then attacked south towards El Guettar destroying a small Axis tank force. On 23 November, Raff attacked north to Ferriana then Sbietla, destroying 12 enemy tanks and taking nearly 100 prisoners, mostly Italians. Raff was promoted to full colonel on 27 November 1942. By 1 December, Raff's command was dubbed the "Tunisian Task Force" (also known as "Raff's Army") and reinforced by the US 3rd Battalion, 26th Infantry and most of 2nd Battalion, 509th Parachute Battalion was withdrawn. On 2 December, Raff launched an attack with E Company 2nd Bn 509th Parachute Infantry, an anti-tank platoon, 3rd Battalion, 26th Infantry (detached from the 1st Infantry Division), B Company 701st Tank Destroyer Battalion, the French Chasseurs de Afrique, a French artillery unit and a company of Algerian Tirailleurs. The force captured the strategic Faid Pass on 3 December along with 120 enemy troops. The defense of the pass was turned over to the French, and the Task Force went into reserve at Sidi-Bou-Zid on 5 December and on 12 December withdrew further to Ferriana as a mobile reserve.

He spent time as an airborne planner on Lieutenant General Omar Bradley's staff and was assigned by Major General Ridgway to lead Task Force Raff, a composite unit of M4 Sherman tanks and scout cars landed at Utah Beach on D-Day, 6 June 1944, to support the 82nd Airborne Division in the American airborne landings in Normandy. When the 82d Airborne Division Chief of Staff was injured, Raff was named temporary replacement and when the commander of the 507th Parachute Infantry Regiment (PIR) was captured in Normandy, Raff was assigned, on June 15, 1944, to command of the regiment. He led the 507th, nicknamed "Raff's Ruffians", through the rest of the war, during the Battle of the Bulge in January 1945 and Operation Varsity in March 1945. After the regiment returned from Normandy in July 1944, due to a dispute between Raff and Major General Ridgway, the division commander, along with Brigadier General James M. Gavin, the Assistant Division Commander (ADC), Raff's 507th Parachute Infantry was transferred to the 17th Airborne Division, commanded by Major General William Miley, Raff's old regimental commander.

As the plane neared the drop zone (DZ) during Operation Varsity, Raff recalled:

I was alone standing in the door of the plane looking down at the river passing beneath the plane, smoke partially obscured my view. At that moment, I said a prayer to the infant Jesus, The Little Flower, 'Little Flower, in this hour show Thy power.' The prayer was given to me by my sister who was a nun. I said the prayer before every jump.

Raff led the regiment in the Western Allied invasion of Germany until the end of World War II in Europe came less than two months later on May 8, 1945, Victory in Europe Day (VE Day).

== Postwar ==
After the war, in 1954, Raff would command the 77th Special Forces Group and the Psychological Warfare Center and School, based at Fort Bragg, North Carolina, and is credited by Lieutenant General William Yarborough (who had served under Raff with the 509th in North Africa) as the "father" of the then-controversial green beret now routinely worn by U.S. Army Special Forces. Raff was relieved as commandant of the PSYWAR Center and School by the XVIII Airborne Corps commander, Lieutenant General Paul D. Adams in April 1956, for allowing Special Forces soldiers to wear the green beret despite LTG Adams banning its wear on Fort Bragg. Ironically, Adams himself was a WWII combat veteran and the first executive officer of the U.S. Army Special Forces' lineage unit, 1st Special Service Force.

Raff retired from the U.S. Army in 1958 as a colonel. He died on March 11, 2003, at 95 years old.

== See also ==
- 2nd Battalion, 509th Parachute Infantry Regiment
- 507th Parachute Infantry Regiment
