= St. John's Lodge =

St. John's Lodge may refer to:

- St John's Lodge, London, a Grade II* listed house in Regents Park, London
- St. John's Lodge (New York City), which possesses the George Washington Inaugural Bible
- St. John's Lodge (Boston), the oldest lodge of the Grand Lodge of Massachusetts, founded in 1733
- St. John's Provincial Grand Lodge, the forerunner of the Grand Lodge of Massachusetts
- St. John's Lodge (Portsmouth, New Hampshire), which claims to be the oldest operating lodge in the Americas
- St. John's Lodge (Newport), the oldest lodge in Rhode Island
- St. John's AF & AM Lodge, also known as Tyler Masonic Lodge in Tyler, Texas
- The St. John's (Secunderabad), the oldest lodge in Telangana and one of the oldest in Madras Presidency
- St. John's No. 1 Lodge, more commonly known as the Tun Tavern Lodge in Philadelphia, with the oldest Masonic document in America
- St. John's Lodge No. 9, a Masonic lodge in Seattle, Washington, chartered in 1860

== See also ==
- The Goldsmid baronets, of St John's Lodge in the County of Surrey
- The Cuyler baronets, of St John's Lodge in Welwyn in the County of Hertford
