= 473rd Infantry Regiment =

473rd Infantry Regimental Combat Team 473rd Infantry Regiment
- Active: 1944-45
- Allegiance: United States
- Branch: United States Army
- Type: Infantry
- Size: Regiment
- Nickname: "Flakfeet"
- Engagements: World War II
- Battle honours: Italian Campaign

Commanders
- Notable commanders: William P. Yarborough

The 473d Infantry Regiment was an infantry regiment of the United States Army that served on the Italian Front during World War II. It was created on 14 January 1945 from existing anti-aircraft units that were no longer needed to defend against enemy aircraft. In August 1945 it was deactivated in Italy.

== History ==
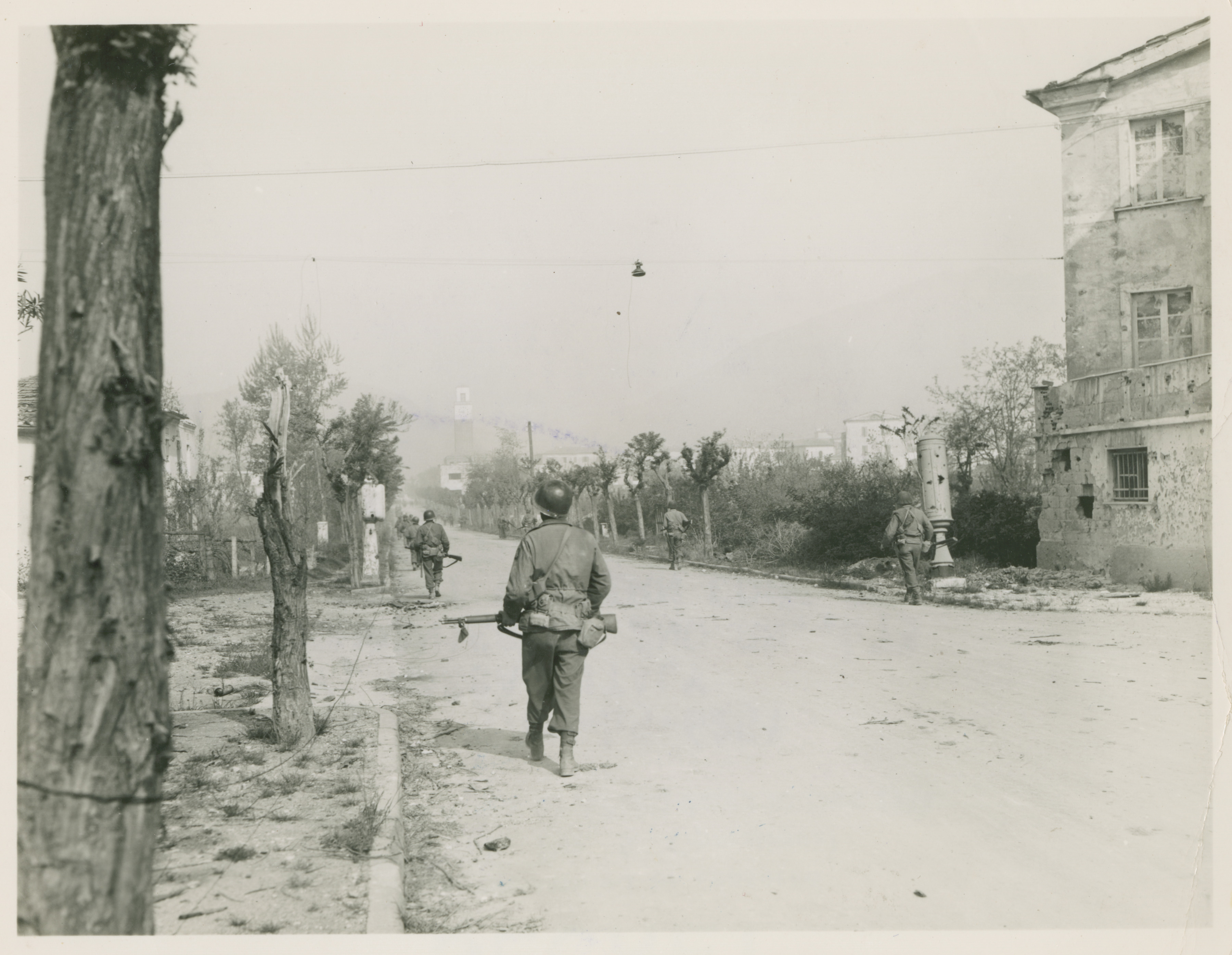
Men of the 2nd Battalion, 473rd Infantry Regiment, skirt the western edge of Massa as the rest of the battalion move onto the heart of town, 10 April 1945.

The 473rd Infantry was first constituted in the Army of the United States as the Headquarters and Headquarters Company, 2nd Tank Group, and activated on 1 March 1942 at Camp Bowie, Texas. It was redesigned the 2nd Armored Group on 19 March 1944, and was disbanded on 19 December 1944 at Montecatini, Italy, and concurrently reconstituted as the Headquarters and Headquarters Company, 473rd Infantry. The 435th Antiaircraft Automatic Weapons Battalion was concurrently disbanded and reconstituted as the 1st Battalion, 473rd Infantry, the 532nd Antiaircraft Artillery Automatic Weapons Battalion as the 2nd Battalion, 473rd Infantry, and the 900th Antiaircraft Artillery Automatic Weapons Battalion as the 3rd Battalion, 473rd Infantry

Most of the elements of the 473rd had been parts of Task Force 45. This was a division-sized unit built around the U.S. 45th Antiaircraft Artillery Brigade with attached British, Brazilian, and Italian elements. The 473rd Infantry, a white unit, was assigned for some time to the African-American 92d Infantry Division starting from 24 February 1945 until 17 May 1945. It was used to replace the African-American 365th Infantry Regiment, which was reassigned to U.S. IV Corps.

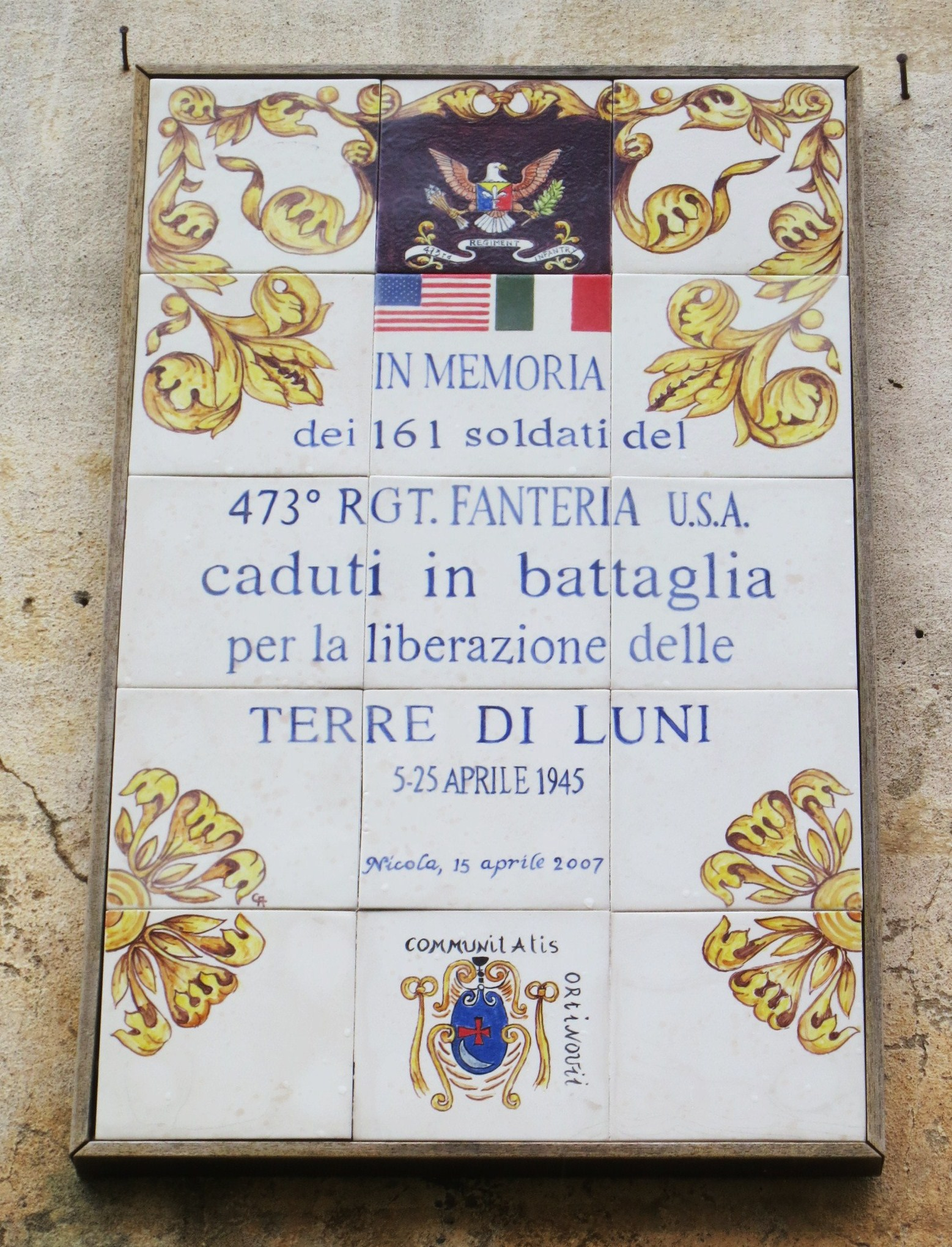
473rd Regiment Memorial Nicola (SP) Italy.

== Components ==
Colonel Willis D. Cronk of Headquarters Company, 2d Armored Group was placed in command during the reorganization but was soon replaced by Col. William P. Yarborough.

Units:
Headquarters Company, 473d

- 1st Battalion / 473d Inf Regt (CO: Lt. Col. Peter L. Urban, Lt.Col. Phelan, Maj Verhuel)
- 2d Battalion / 473d Inf Regt (CO: Lt. Col Hampton H. Lisle, Maj. Crandall)
- 3d Battalion / 473d Inf Regt (CO: Maj. Paul Woodward)
