= St. John's Lodge (Newport) =

St. John's Lodge #1 in Portsmouth, Rhode Island (originally located in Newport, Rhode Island), founded in 1749, is the oldest lodge of Freemasons in the state of Rhode Island.

The lodge met in Newport until it was moved to Portsmouth, Rhode Island about 1985.
