= Doyle Yardley =

Colonel Doyle Raphard Yardley (April 21, 1913 – April 23, 1946) was a United States Army officer. Yardley was a resident of Dublin, Texas and the son of Alvin Alfard Yardley and Emma Edna Huffman. During World War II, was the commanding officer of the 509th Parachute Infantry Battalion, and was captured and later escaped from a German prisoner-of-war camp. During the Allied invasion of Italy, the 509th was dropped behind Axis lines near Avellino. Yardley was captured by Axis forces and spent 16 months as a prisoner of war in Oflag 64, located in the Polish city of Szubin.

Yardley eventually escaped from German custody in 1945 and briefly joined the Red Army's drive through Germany before being evacuated by ship back to North America. He died shortly after the war from accidentally shooting himself in his chest while cleaning his hunting rifle. He kept a diary of his war experiences which he left behind when he escaped from the camp. It was returned to him after the war and languished in an old military footlocker in Texas until found by his nephew, who published it under the title Home Was Never Like This.
