= 509th Infantry Regiment =

509th Parachute Infantry Regiment 509th Infantry Regiment
- 509th Infantry Regiment coat of arms
- Active: 1942–45; 1947-present
- Country: United States
- Branch: United States Army
- Type: Airborne forces
- Role: Airborne infantry
- Size: Two battalions
- Part of: Joint Readiness Training Center and 2nd Infantry Brigade Combat Team (Airborne), 11th Airborne Division
- Garrison/HQ: Fort Polk, Louisiana and Fort Richardson, Alaska
- Nicknames: The Gingerbread Men; Geronimo "G" Man
- Motto: All the Way / Geronimo
- Colors: Black and gold
- Engagements: World War II: North Africa Campaign (WWII); Italy; Southern France; Battle of the Bulge; War on terror: Operation Iraqi Freedom; Operation Enduring Freedom; Operation Freedom's Sentinel

Commanders
- Current commander: LTC Cody R. Grimm
- Notable commanders: Edson Raff; Doyle Yardley; William P. Yarborough

Insignia
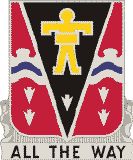
- Distinctive unit insignia

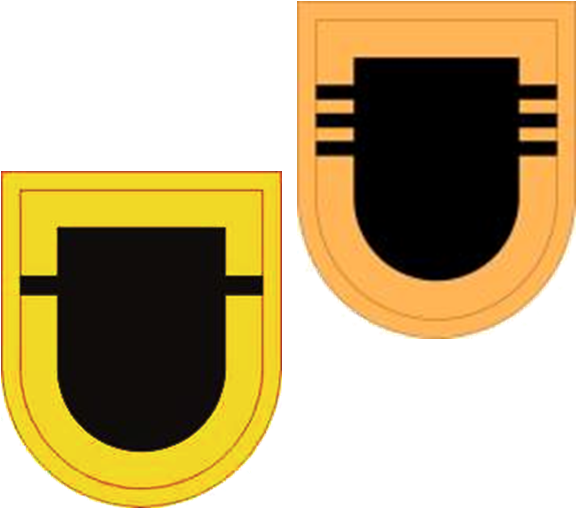
- Beret flashes for 1st and 3rd Battalion

- World War II pocket patch and beret flash

C-17 conducts airborne operation with 3rd Battalion, 509th Infantry Regiment
An aircrew from the 517th Airlift Sq conducts nighttime airdrop of HMMWVs and paratroopers from 4th BCT(A), 25th ID

The 509th Infantry Regiment (previously the 509th Parachute Infantry Regiment) is an airborne infantry regiment of the United States Army. The unit was initially activated as a single battalion, the 504th Parachute Infantry Battalion, in October 1941 at Fort Benning, Georgia. Nicknamed "Geronimo", the 509th conducted the U.S. Army's first combat jump during World War II on 8 November 1942, flying 1,500 miles from England to seize Tafarquay airport in Oran, Algeria. The 509th made a total of five combat jumps during the war.

The 1st and 3rd Battalions remain active. 1st Battalion serves as the Opposing Force (OPFOR) at the U.S. Army's Joint Readiness Training Center at Fort Polk, Louisiana, while 3rd Battalion is assigned to the 2nd Infantry Brigade Combat Team (Airborne), 11th Airborne Division, at Fort Richardson, Alaska. The 509th operates independently from larger airborne units such as the 82nd Airborne Division.

== History ==
The advent of World War II ushered in a need for highly mobile units capable of quick insertion within the theater of battle by the Allies. Originally constituted on March 14, 1941, as the 504th Parachute Infantry Battalion (PIB) and activated on October 5, the 509th PIB qualified its first paratroopers at Fort Benning, Georgia. The unit moved to Fort Bragg, North Carolina, where the 503rd and 504th Parachute Infantry Battalions were consolidated together to form the 503rd Parachute Infantry Regiment on February 24, 1942, two months after the United States entered World War II. The 504th PIB was reorganized and reflagged as the 503rd's 2nd Battalion, with Companies A, B, and C becoming Companies D, E, and F, respectively. This unit trained with the British 1st Parachute Brigade in England, earned the honorary title "Red Devils", and were authorized to wear the maroon beret. The maroon beret remains an iconic symbol of airborne units. Paratroopers wear it today.

In June 1942, under the command of Lieutenant Colonel Edson Duncan Raff, the battalion was detached from the 503rd PIR and sailed to Scotland, becoming the first American parachute unit to go overseas in World War II. The battalion was attached to the British 1st Airborne Division for training, which included mass tactical jumps from C-47 aircraft at 350 feet, extensive night training, and speed marching for 10 miles to and from the training area daily; and on one occasion, marching 32 miles in 11 hours. In the summer of 1942, Allied forces were completing the task of planning Operation Torch, the Allied invasion of North Africa, with the 2nd Battalion, 503rd PIR scheduled to take the lead and make the first combat jump.

Operation Torch was the first joint military action undertaken by the Allies in World War II. This was the springboard for the idea, formed by British Prime Minister Winston Churchill, of attacking the "soft underbelly of Europe" before attempting a cross-channel attack from England onto mainland Europe. The main objective of Torch was to seize French Northwest Africa and, for political reasons, the Americans would lead operation. The airborne segment of the operation entailed flying 1,500 miles from England to seize two French airfields near Oran.

On 2 November 1942, days before Operation Torch began, the unit was reflagged once again as the 2nd Battalion, 509th Parachute Infantry. On this day, as C-47s flew over the English countryside, the 509th paratrooper was born.

=== World War II ===
==== North Africa Campaign - Operation Torch ====
The 2-509th carried out the first American combat jump during the invasion of North Africa. The transport planes flew all the way from English airfields to the African coast. This first operation was unsuccessful, with 7 of its 39 C-47s widely scattered. Only 10 aircraft actually dropped their troops, while the others unloaded after 28 troop carriers, nearly out of fuel, landed on the Sebkha d'Oran, a dry lake near their target. The 509th marched overland to occupy its objective, and on 15 November 355 paratroopers successfully dropped on the Youks-les-Bains Airfield.

==== Italy Campaign ====
===== Liberation of Ventotene - Italy =====
Forty-six paratroopers from the 509th's Scout Company (the first pathfinders) participated in the liberation of Ventotene, a small Italian island, on 9 September 1943, capturing 90 Germans. The German commander was tricked into surrendering to the weaker American force before realizing his mistake. An account of this is given in John Steinbeck's "Once There Was a War." On 10 December 1943, the battalion was redesignated as the 509th Parachute Infantry Battalion.

===== Italy & Southern France =====
During 1943–1944, the 509th PIR served in the Italian mainland campaign and invasion of southern France. Because of the terrain, in both campaigns the regiment often found itself serving as de facto mountain infantry.

The Italian mainland campaign began with a combat jump at Avellino, on 14 September 1943 was widely dispersed and failed, incurring significant casualties.

On 22 January 1944, the 509th PIR took part in the seaborne landings at Anzio, just south of Rome. Corporal Paul B. Huff, a member of the 509th, became the first US paratrooper to be awarded the Medal of Honor, on 29 February 1944, after an action at Anzio.

A second combat jump, on 15 August 1944, occurred around Le Muy and St Tropez in southern France.

==== France - Operation Dragoon - Southern France ====
Southern France.

==== Belgium - Battle of the Bulge ====
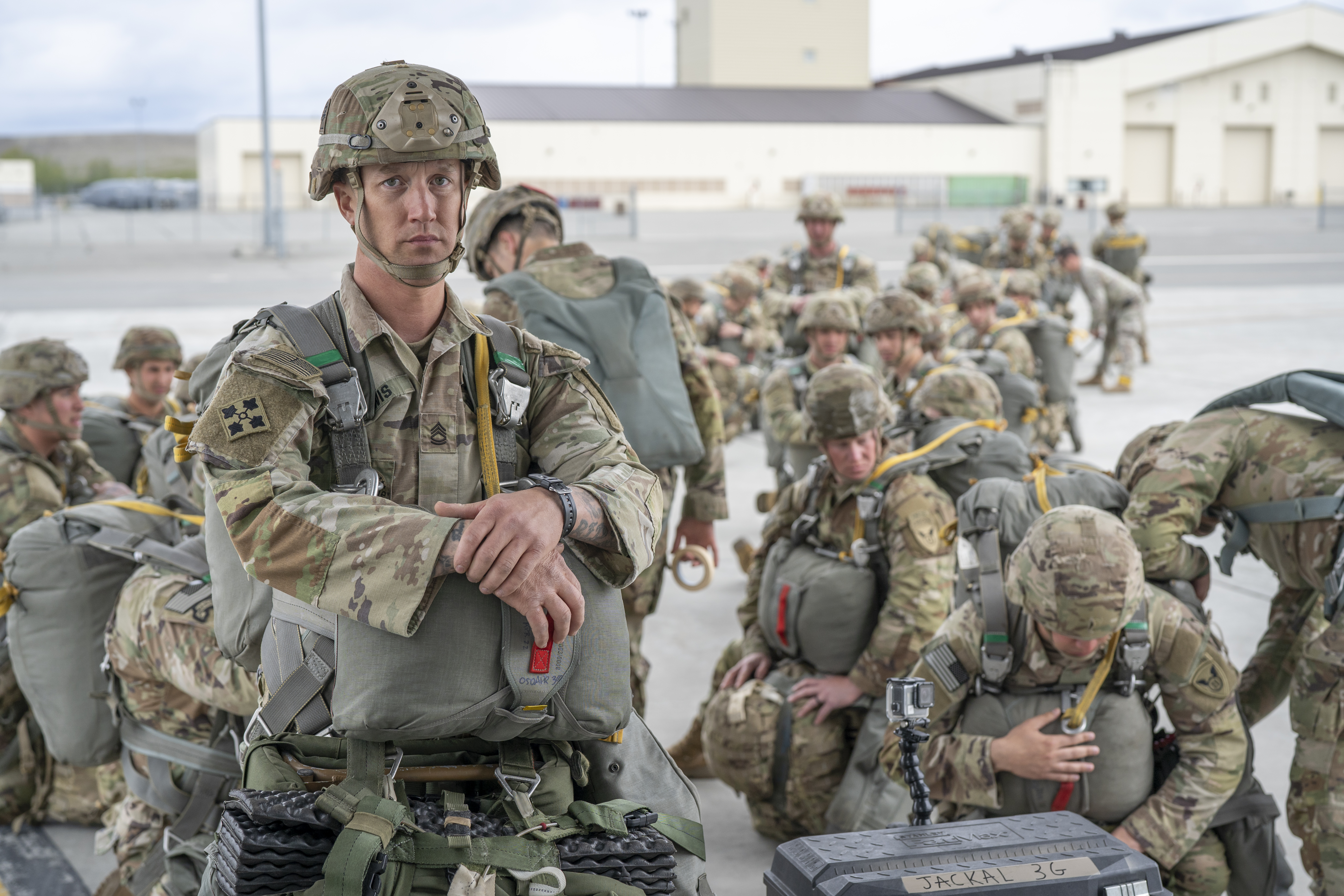
Both 1st Battalion and 3rd Battalion preparing for a jump May 31, 2023.

During the Battle of the Bulge in late 1944, the 509th fought in Belgium to blunt the German attack. An account of this battle is described in the book "Bloody Clash at Sadzot." The 509th Infantry Regiment's service during World War II concluded at the end of January 1945 near St. Vith, Belgium. Of the original 700 paratroopers who entered the battle, approximately ninety-three percent were injured. Effective 1 March 1945, the 509th PIB was disbanded, and the soldiers who remained were reassigned as replacements in the U.S. 82nd Airborne Division or the U.S. 17th Airborne Division.

=== Post-World War II ===
==== Germany ====
After World War II, the colors of the 509th remained inactive until 1963, when Company A, 509th PIB was reactivated as HHC, 1st Battalion (Airborne), 509th Infantry, and Company B, 509th PIB was reactivated as HHC, 2nd Battalion (Airborne), 509th Infantry.

Since 1958 the 8th Infantry Division in Germany had had an Airborne component consisting of the 1st Airborne Battle Group, 504th Infantry, and the 1st Airborne Battle Group, 505th Infantry, as well as other supporting elements on jump status. When the division reorganized from the Pentomic structure to the new structure using brigades and battalions, 1-504th and 1-505th were replaced by 1-509th and 2-509th, respectively. Located at Lee Barracks in Mainz-Gonsenheim, Germany, the two battalions formed the infantry component of the 1st Brigade (Airborne), 8th Infantry Division (Mechanized). Other units of the brigade included the 5th Battalion (Airborne), 81st Artillery; Troop A (Airborne), 3rd Squadron, 8th Cavalry; Company A (Airborne), 12th Engineer Battalion; and Company B (Airborne), 8th Medical Battalion.

==== Italy ====
In 1973, as the 1st Brigade's jump status was ending, a new unit with the designation of 3d Battalion (Airborne), 509th Infantry (bearing the lineage of the World War II-era Company C, 509th PIB) was activated to form an Airborne Battalion Combat Team (ABCT) from elements of the existing airborne forces within the brigade. After a brief training period at Rhine Kaserne Barracks in West Germany, the unit moved to Vicenza, Italy, as a separate Airborne Battalion Combat Team. Commanded by LTC Ward M. Lehardy, it was composed of a Headquarters and Headquarters Company (HHC), a Combat Support Company (CSC), three Airborne Rifle Companies, and Company D, a field artillery battery, the predecessor of what later became Battery D, 319th Field Artillery (towed 105 mm) activated on 1 October 1988. The colors of 1-509th and 2-509th were reflagged as 2-28th and 2-87th. Shortly after its arrival in Italy, the 3d Battalion, 509th Infantry was reflagged as the 1st Battalion, 509th Infantry. In 1983, 1-509th in Italy was reflagged as the 4th Battalion (Airborne), 325th Infantry to align it with elements of the 82nd Airborne Division at Fort Bragg under an Army-wide combat arms battalion rotation program.

==== Geronimo returns to the United States ====
Former Aviation Center and School's Company C, 509th Infantry Beret Flash

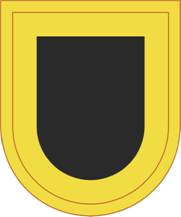
Former SETAF's 1st Battalion, 509th Infantry Beret Flash

On 1 July 1975 the lineage of Co C, 509th PIB was again reactivated, this time at Fort Rucker, Alabama, as the separate Company C (Pathfinder), 509th Infantry. The company was created by reflagging the existing 5th Infantry Detachment (Pathfinder), which had served at the post since 24 June 1963. (A Pathfinder presence at Fort Rucker can be traced back to 1960 with the activation of the Pathfinder Team, Company A, 2d Battle Group, 31st Infantry, to support the Aviation Center. It was authorized two lieutenants, an E-7, an E-5, four E-4s and four E-3s, by order of a letter from the Department of the Army to the Commanding General, Third US Army dated 10 March 1960 with the subject line "Reorganization of the 2d Battle Group, 31st Infantry." On 24 June 1963 the pathfinder unit was reflagged as the 5th Infantry Detachment.) Contrary to some erroneous accounts, Company C (Pathfinder) 509th Infantry was not created by transferring Company C, 1st Battalion, 509th Infantry from Italy to Fort Rucker; these companies were two separate units. There had already been a Pathfinder presence at Fort Rucker for 15 years. Even if the 5th Infantry Detachment (Pathfinder) had not already existed, the Army would not have reduced the strength of its forward-deployed Airborne Battalion Combat Team in Europe when sufficient manning was available in CONUS. Additionally, the organization and manning of an Airborne Rifle Company is different from that of an Airborne Pathfinder Company.

The size of C-509th varied depending upon funding and mission requirements. For example, documents on file at the United States Army Center of Military History in Washington, DC, indicate that when the company was activated in 1975 by replacing the 5th Infantry Detachment (Pathfinder), it was authorized 4 officers and 108 enlisted soldiers. Documents dated 22 September 1987 show the unit as still having 4 officers authorized but only 77 enlisted soldiers.

The orange and black flash, seen on the right, was first worn by the 5th Infantry Detachment (Pathfinder), matching the colors of the shoulder sleeve insignia of the U.S. Army Aviation Center and School to which the unit was assigned. The 5th wore this patch with a black and gold Airborne tab.

The 5th was expanded and reflagged to become C-509th in 1975 and subsequently the company adopted the same flash and wing oval worn by 1-509th in Vicenza, Italy. On 18 February 1977 the 1st Aviation Brigade, which had served as a combat unit in Vietnam, was reactivated as a training unit at Fort Rucker, resulting in C-509th being assigned to the brigade. As a unit of the 1st Aviation Brigade, C-509th adopted the brigade shoulder sleeve insignia and worn it beneath a blue and white Airborne tab.

Note: The U.S. Army Institute of Heraldry notes that an Airborne tab is an intrinsic part of a shoulder sleeve insignia and is not supposed to be worn as an add-on by Airborne units assigned to non-Airborne commands; however, this has been a common practice in the Army for many decades.

The lineage of 1-509th was reactivated provisionally in 1987 to serve as the OPFOR at the Joint Readiness Training Center at Fort Chaffee, Arkansas. The unit was activated at Little Rock Air Force Base in a formal ceremony on 21 May 1988. The unit was stationed at LRAFB because it provided modern quarters and facilities that Ft. Chaffee lacked, and it deployed on a per-rotation basis to Ft. Chaffee. The unit served and serves as the opposing force for American and Allied light infantry. In June 1993, 1-509th moved along with the Joint Readiness Training Center to Fort Polk, Louisiana. Since moving to Fort Polk, 1-509th Infantry has become an elite urban fighting training unit.

On 31 May 1993, the separate Company C (Pathfinder), 509th Infantry at Fort Rucker was reflagged as Company A (Pathfinder), 511th Infantry, reactivating the colors of a unit that had served with the long-inactive 11th Airborne Division and the short-lived (1963–65) 11th Air Assault Division (Test). The era of a Pathfinder unit at Fort Rucker ended on 31 October 1995 when A-511th was inactivated to meet budget cut ceilings.

=== Global war on terror ===
==== Operation Iraqi Freedom ====
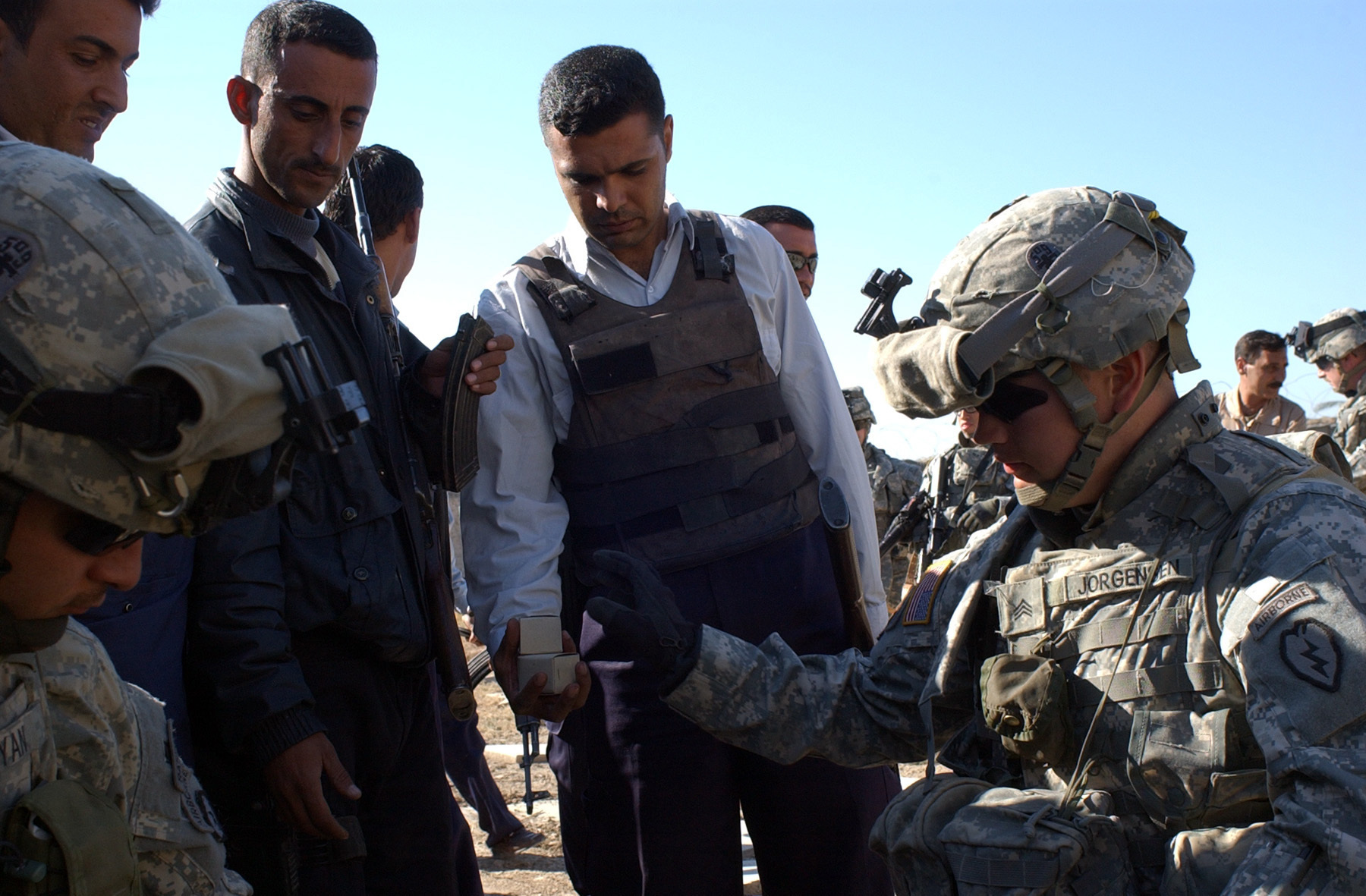
Soldiers of the 509th in Iraq 2006

In May 2004 Companies A and B, with attachments from Troop D of the 1st Battalion, 509th Infantry deployed to Iraq in support of Operation Iraqi Freedom II to the areas surrounding Baghdad to reinforce the 10th Mountain Division. One member of Troop D received the Silver Star for Valor in combat. Companies A and B and attachments returned in March 2005. During the deployment, Troop D and HHC continued to support JRTC exercises.

With the expansion of the Airborne force in Alaska from a single battalion (1st Battalion, 501st Infantry Regiment) at Fort Richardson, Alaska to a brigade 4th Brigade Combat Team (Airborne), 25th Infantry Division, the lineage of Company C, 509th PIB was again reactivated on 16 September 2005 as the 3d Battalion, 509th Infantry at Fort Richardson. The battalion deployed with the 4th BCT in support of Operation Iraqi Freedom in October 2006. The following is a media release from 10 November 2007, covering the battalion's work during OIF:

KALSU, Iraq — Paratroopers from the 3rd Battalion (Airborne), 509th Infantry Regiment based at Fort Richardson, Alaska have returned home after being deployed in Iraq since early October 2006.

After conducting numerous combat operations to include patrols, raids, and air assault operations with the Iraqi Army and Police, these Paratroopers are ready to stand down for some well-deserved rest, relaxation and getting re-acquainted with their families and friends. Since October 2006, the "Geronimos" from 3-509th Airborne have performed magnificently. During this deployment, the Geronimos were based out of Forward Operating Base Kalsu, located approximately 40 miles (64 km) south of Baghdad in Babil Province. On Christmas Day of 2006, part of the Battalion moved west of Baghdad to Al Anbar Province where they fought with the 1st and 2nd Marine Expeditionary Forces (Forward) against Al Qaeda in Iraq. While providing protection to the local citizens of the area, they were quite effective in helping the local populations create their own civil defense organizations, something that has become a model for success in stemming violence countrywide. During this time, the remaining Paratroopers also operated out of FOB Kalsu and FOB Iskandariyah to achieve similar goals. The Battalion consolidated in June at FOB Kalsu and began concerted efforts to stabilize their area of operation in Babil Province. In the months following, the Geronimos took on the role as a strike force, where they made great strides in fostering reconciliation between Sunnis and Shias in the cities of Haswah and Iskandariyah, and the surrounding areas. Operating "outside the wire", the paratroopers encountered many obstacles, including firefights with insurgents, improvised explosive devices, car bombs and explosively formed projectiles. They also captured numerous suspects, extremists, and terrorists considered to be high value targets, found a myriad of weapons caches, IED making facilities, al-Qaeda safe houses, and facilities used for detaining and torturing Iraqi citizens by performing countless operations, day and night, on the ground and by air assault.

Throughout their deployment, many of the Paratroopers received decorations for valor, achievement, and combat wounds. The 3-509th is part of the 4th BCT (Airborne), 25th Infantry Division also known as the "Spartan Brigade". After doing a most remarkable job as part of Operation Iraqi Freedom, these "Spartans" are looking forward to some quiet time and enjoying the safety and freedom that they have worked so very hard to keep for all American citizens.

==== Operation Enduring Freedom ====
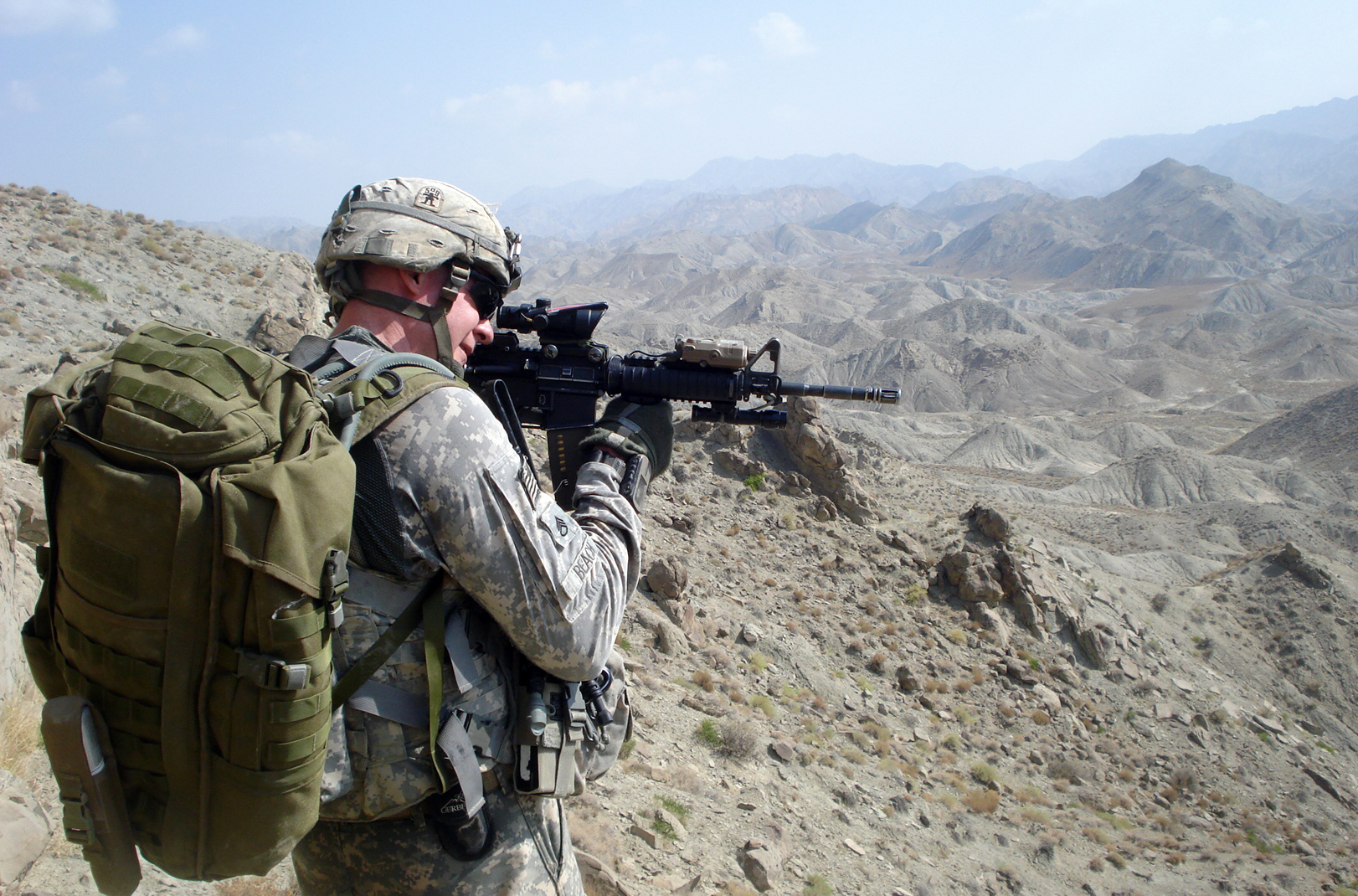
509th during a patrol in Afghanistan 2009

In February 2009 the Geronimo battalion deployed as a part of the 4th BCT (Airborne), 25th Infantry Division in support of Operation Enduring Freedom. A portion of the Valorous Unit Award citation is below.

For extraordinary heroism in action against an armed enemy. During the period 1 July 2009 to 30 November 2009, Headquarters and Headquarters Company, 3d Battalion, 509th Infantry Regiment and its subordinate units displayed extraordinary heroism in action against an armed enemy in support of Operation Enduring Freedom in the vicinity of East Paktika. The unit conducted a total of 302 combat patrols, and was responsible for 398 enemies killed, as well as the capture of 34 detainees. The company was also responsible for the safety of the populace of East Paktika during Afghan national elections. The unit's unrelenting perseverance and coordination allowed the unit to advance the struggle against the Taliban and contribute to the political and economic growth and development of the region.

==== Operation Freedom's Sentinel ====
See Operation Freedom's Sentinel

== Lineage ==
509th Infantry Regiment

- 1st Battalion

Official website:

- 2d Battalion (Inactive)
- 3d Battalion

== Coat of arms ==
=== Blazon ===
==== Shield ====
Gules, a fess nebuly counter wavy Argent a barrulet wavy Azure, on a pile Sable fimbriated of the second, between in base 4 arrowheads points down palewise of the same, another of the like below a stylized figure of a parachutist Or.

==== Crest ====
On a wreath Argent and Gules, a rock proper charged with a crescent Or, a prowling desert jackal of the like.

==== Motto ====
ALL THE WAY

=== Symbolism ===
The stylized figure of a golden parachutist on a black background is taken from the WW2 insigna of the unit. The wavy lines represents the Anzio amphibious landing on January 22, 1944. The arrowheads represent the participation in five air landing operations during WW2. The prowling jackal on the crest is taken from the badge of the French 3rd Zouaves Regiment, that the French Army Commander-in-Chief authorized to be worn as a mark of honour by the 509th Regiment after the November 15th 1942 airdrop on the Youks-les-Bains Airfield in Algeria.

=== Background ===
The coat of arms was approved on 30 September 1963.

== Honors ==
=== Decorations ===
1st BN, 509th Infantry Regiment

Ribbon	Award	Year	Notes
Dark blue ribbon with a gold border	Presidential Unit Citation (Army)	1944	for fighting in the LIEGE, BELGIUM
Dark blue ribbon with a gold border	Presidential Unit Citation (Army)	1943	for fighting in the CARANO, ITALY
	Meritorious Unit Commendation	2004	Company B, 1st BN, 509th IN - for fighting in Operation Iraqi Freedom
A red ribbon with a vertical green stripe running down the center	Superior Unit Award	2011-2012	for fighting in Operation Enduring Freedom-Afghanistan
A red ribbon with a vertical green stripe running down the center	Superior Unit Award	2009-2010	for fighting in Operation Iraqi Freedom-Iraq
A red ribbon with a vertical green stripe running down the center	Superior Unit Award	1993-1994	

3rd BN, 509th Infantry Regiment

Ribbon	Award	Year	Notes
Dark blue ribbon with a gold border	Presidential Unit Citation (Army)	1944	for fighting in the LIEGE, BELGIUM
Dark blue ribbon with a gold border	Presidential Unit Citation (Army)	1944	for fighting in the CARANO, ITALY March 1944
Dark blue ribbon with a gold border	Presidential Unit Citation (Army)	1943	for fighting in the CARANO, ITALY
Valorous Unit Award	Valorous Unit Award (Army)	2009	for fighting in PAKTIKA PROVINCE Operation Enduring Freedom-Afghanistan
Valorous Unit Award	Valorous Unit Award (Army)	2007	for fighting in BABIL PROVINCE Operation Iraqi Freedom-Iraq
Valorous Unit Award	Valorous Unit Award (Army)	2007	Company D, for fighting in Operation Iraqi Freedom-Iraq
Valorous Unit Award	Valorous Unit Award (Army)	2006	for fighting in AL ANBAR PROVINCE, Operation Iraqi Freedom-Iraq

Additional Decorations Include:

- French Croix de Guerre with Silver Star, World War II for MUY EN Province
- Cited in the Order of the Day of the Belgian Army for action in the ARDENNES
- Cited in the Order of the Day of the Belgian Army for action at ST. VITH
- Personnel authorized to wear the insignia of the French 3d Zouaves Regiment

=== Campaign participation credit ===
- World War II:
  - Algeria-French Morocco (with arrowhead);
  - Tunisia (with arrowhead);
  - Naples-Foggia (with arrowhead);
  - Anzio (with arrowhead);
  - Rome-Arno;
  - Southern France (with arrowhead);
  - Rhineland;
  - Ardennes-Alsace
- Global War on Terror:
  - Operation Iraqi Freedom - II
  - Operation Iraqi Freedom - V
  - Operation Enduring Freedom - X

== Combat Parachute Jumps ==
List of 509th Parachute Infantry Regiment Combat Parachute Jumps
Date	Unit	Operation	Troopers	Country	Dropzone
8 Nov. 1942	509th Parachute Infantry Battalion (PIB)	Torch	556	Algeria	Tafaraoui airfield, La Senia
15 Nov. 1942	509th PIB	Torch	300 - 350	Algeria	Youks les Bains
24 Dec. 1942	509th PIB, Hdqt's. Co. Two French paratroopers		32	Tunisia	El Djem
14 Sep. 1943	509th PIB	Avalanche	640	Italy	Avellino
15 Aug. 1944	1st Abn. Task Force (460th PFA, 463rd PFABn.; 509th PIB; 517th PCT; 551st PIB; 596th PCEng. Co.)	Dragoon	5,607	France	Cote d' Azur, Riviera

== Organization timeline and major events ==
- Constituted 14 March 1941 in the Army of the United States as the 504th Parachute Infantry Battalion, consisting of HHC and Companies A, B & C.
- Activated 5 October 1941 at Fort Benning, Georgia.
- Reorganized and redesignated 24 February 1942 as the 2d Battalion, 503d Parachute Infantry Regiment, consisting of HHC and Companies D, E, and F. Battalion deployed detached from the Regiment to England.
- 2/503 PIR arrived in England, and reorganized and redesignated 2 November 1942 as the 2d Battalion, 509th Parachute Infantry Regiment, consisting of HHC and Companies D, E, and F. Remainder of 503rd Parachute Infantry Regiment proceeded to Pacific Theater and separate Lineage with new 2nd Battalion.
- 2/509 PIR assaulted Oran and Youks-les-Bains Airfield in North Africa as part of Operation TORCH.
- TORCH assignment terminated, and unit attached to the 82nd Airborne Division on 15 November 1942.
- 2/509 PIR assaulted Salerno. Italy on 9 September 1943 as part of Operation Avalanche.
- 2/509 PIR parachuted onto Avellino on 14 September 1943. The unit was immediately engaged upon landing by German Forces, and was badly decimated. Unit was subsequently withdrawn from combat, and temporarily assigned as Security for Headquarters, 5th U.S. Army.
- 2/509 PIR located at Venafro, Italy, and reorganized and redesignated 10 December 1943 as the 509th Parachute Infantry Battalion, consisting of HHC and Companies A, B, and C.
- Battalion arrived in France on 15 August 1944, for the start of Operation Dragoon.
- Operation Dragoon finished successfully on 14 September 1944, and Battalion released for
- 509 PIB engaged in Rhineland Campaign on 5 September 1944.
- 509 PIB relieved from Rhineland Campaign, and assigned to the 101st Airborne Division on 18 November 1944.
- 509th Parachute Infantry Battalion relieved From assignment to 101st Airborne Division 18 December 1944 and prepared for unit disbandment and personnel and equipment reassignment.
- 509 PIB Disbanded 1 March 1945 in France, with personnel and equipment reassigned to the 82nd Airborne Division.
- Unit Reconstituted 12 May 1947 in the Regular Army as the 509th Parachute Infantry Battalion.
- Reorganized and redesignated 1 April 1963 as the 509th Infantry, a parent regiment under the Combat Arms Regimental System. 509th Infantry assigned to the 8th Infantry Division and was activated same date in Germany.
- 3/509th Infantry organic elements constituted 15 January 1972.
- 3/509th Infantry activated 15 January 1973 in Germany.
- 2/509th Infantry and 3-509th Infantry inactivated 31 August 1973 in Germany and relieved from assignment to the 8th Infantry Division.
- 1/509th Infantry relieved 1 September 1973 from assignment to the 8th Infantry Division.
- Headquarters and Headquarters Company, 3rd Battalion, 509th Infantry redesignated 1 July 1975 as Company C, 509th Infantry and activated at Fort Rucker, Alabama.
- 1/509th Infantry inactivated 1 July 1983 in Italy.
- 509th Infantry withdrawn 16 January 1986 from the Combat Arms Regimental System and reorganized under the United States Army Regimental System.
- Headquarters, 509th Infantry transferred 18 December 1987 to the United States Army Training and Doctrine Command, and activated at Little Rock Air Force Base, Arkansas.
- C-509th Infantry transferred 2 October 1988 to the United States Army Training and Doctrine Command and reorganized at Fort Rucker, Alabama.
  - 509th Infantry transferred same date to the United States Army Training and Doctrine Command.
- 1-509th Infantry activated 21 May 1988 at Little Rock Air Force Base, Arkansas.
- 1-509th Infantry inactivated 31 May 1993 at Little Rock Air Force Base, Arkansas, and withdrawn from the United States Army Training and Doctrine Command.
  - C-509th Infantry inactivated same date at Fort Rucker, Alabama, and withdrawn from the United States Army Training and Doctrine Command.
- 1/509th Infantry activated 15 January 1994 at Fort Polk, Louisiana.
- A CO and B CO 1-509th Infantry deployed in June 2004 in support of OIF to Baghdad, Iraq. The two airborne infantry companies were attached to 2nd Brigade, 10th Mountain Division. A CO was attached to 2-14 IN and B CO was attached to 4-31 IN. Both companies returned from combat in March 2005.
- C-509th Infantry redesignated 10 December 2004 as Headquarters and Headquarters Company, 3rd Battalion, 509th Infantry.
- HHC, 3/509th Infantry Regiment assigned 16 September 2005 to the 4th Brigade Combat Team, 25th Infantry Division, and activated at Fort Richardson, Alaska.
- September 2006: 3/509th IN (ABN) deploys in support of OIF.
- December 2007: 3/509th IN (ABN) returns from OIF deployment.
- February 2009: 3/509th IN (ABN) deploys in support of OEF.
- March 2010: 3/509th IN (ABN) returns from OEF deployment.
- December 2011: 3/509th IN (ABN) deploys in support of OEF.
- September 2017: 3/509th IN (ABN) deploys in support of OFS.
- Companies C and E activated on 12 September 2014 as part of 1st Battalion, 509th Infantry at Fort Polk, Louisiana.
