= Rommel's asparagus =

Airborne landing obstacle deployed by German forces in WW2

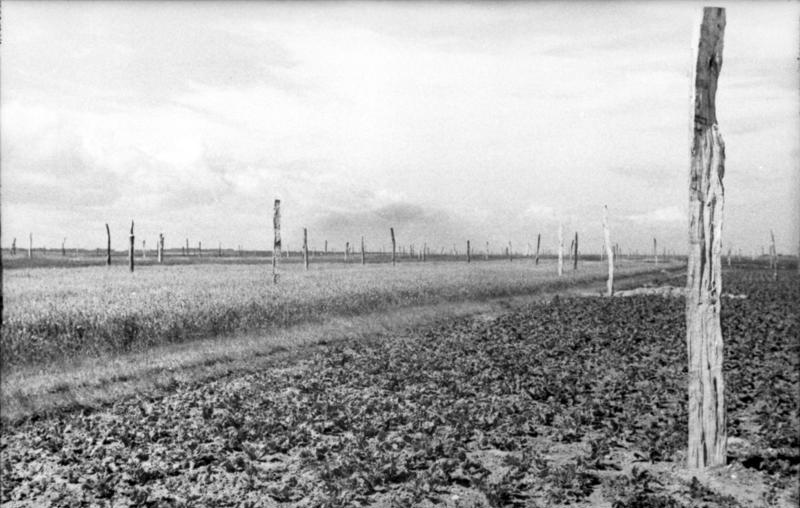
Wooden poles set in France in 1944 to damage military gliders and to kill or injure glider infantry

Rommel's asparagus (German: Rommelspargel; German pronunciation: [ˈʁɔml̩ˌʃpaʁɡl̩]) or Holzpfähle ("wooden poles") were wooden poles erected in early 1944 by Axis forces in coastal areas of France and the Netherlands as defenses against Allied military gliders and paratroopers.

The 4-to-5-metre (13 to 16 ft) logs were called Rommelspargel after Field Marshal Erwin Rommel, who ordered their design and use; he called the defensive concept Luftlandehindernis ("air-landing obstacle").

Rommel's forces placed more than a million wooden poles in fields, but their effect on the invasion of Normandy was inconsequential. Later, in the French Riviera, only about 300 Allied casualties were attributed to the tactic. These casualties could have been caused immediately or over time from trauma to the brain, organs, infection, etc.

Rommel's asparagus refers specifically to wooden poles used against aerial invasion. The term has also been used to describe wooden logs set into the beaches of the English Channel and the Atlantic Ocean to disrupt amphibious landings of troops. Testing found these wooden defenses too weak to stop boats, and they were largely abandoned in favor of Hemmbalken ("obstruction beams") and other beach defenses.

== Design and development ==
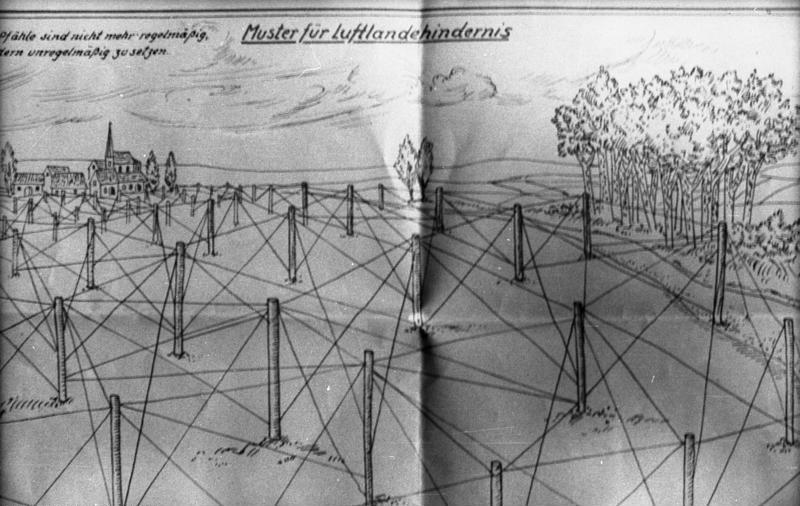
Plans for wooden log and wire defenses which Field Marshal Erwin Rommel sent to his subordinate commanders.

The use of sharpened wooden poles as obstacles is not new in warfare, and their application to defending against invasion from the sky only slightly post-dates the advent of air-landing by troops itself; such obstacles were littered over the British countryside in the summer of 1940 after the threat of invasion from the air became all too apparent. By 1944 the threat from paratroops was very much that of an Allied invasion of German-occupied territory. In November 1943, when Rommel took command of the German Army Group B in occupied France, he also took control of the Atlantic Wall defenses on the French coasts facing the United Kingdom. During a tour of anti-invasion fortifications Rommel concluded that the defenses would have to be improved, and quickly. He ordered millions of wooden tree trunks and logs to be set against airborne forces. Barbed wire and tripwires were to be strung between the poles. On plans that Rommel sent to his subordinates, the complete system of wooden poles and interconnecting wires was called Luftlandehindernis.

Along inland fields and meadows where enemy gliders could land, Rommel specified that 15-to-30-centimetre (6 to 12 in) diameter wooden poles were to be set into the ground with some 2 to 4 metres (8 to 12 ft) of the pole projecting upward. In every 1 square kilometre (0.4 sq mi) there would be placed approximately 1,000 such defenses. The wooden poles were to be made from tree trunks or very thick tree branches. The tops of the poles were often connected by tripwires, and every third log carried a mine or hand grenade on top. Not only were tree trunks used as poles but steel rails were put to the same purpose in some locations.

Air-landing obstacles were not the only tactic Rommel used against aerial invaders. Rommel ordered the flooding of some fields so that glider troops and paratroops landing in the water would drown. He ordered machine gun crews to cover the exits of fields that were bounded by bocage—tall, dense hedgerows—so that glider infantry and paratroopers would come under fire as they moved out of their landing area. The bocage hedgerows themselves were the worst hazard to safe glider landings, and caused more glider casualties than Rommelspargel.

Rommel reported after an inspection tour in April 1944 that "The construction of anti-paratroop obstacles has made great progress in many divisions. For example, one division alone has erected almost 300,000 stakes, and one corps over 900,000." Rommel emphasized that "Erecting stakes alone does not make the obstacles complete; the stakes must be wired together and shells and mines attached to them... It will still be possible for tethered cattle to pasture underneath these mined obstacles."

== Operational history ==
=== Normandy invasion ===
From February 1944, Allied reconnaissance showed the growing presence of Rommelspargel in landing fields, placed about 23 to 30 metres (75 to 100 ft) apart. Commander-in-Chief Trafford Leigh-Mallory, in charge of the Allied Expeditionary Air Force that would be conducting air operations during the invasion of Europe, studied the threat and projected glider troops taking as much as 70% casualties from all sources, primarily from the wooden poles. On 30 May Leigh-Mallory went to see Eisenhower as he was concerned about the two American airborne divisions facing "futile slaughter" jumping onto Rommel's asparagus with heavy losses; he recommended the western drop be cancelled (but the British drop was less perilous). Eisenhower consulted his airborne commanders and decided Leigh-Mallory was wrong; it would have meant cancelling the attack on Utah Beach.

However, Allied leaders noticed that German planners appeared to expect airborne landings to be carried out relatively far from the beaches. In response, invasion plans concentrated most landings near the beaches where fewer fields were planted with Rommelspargel.

Most of the Allied contact with Rommelspargel in Normandy was by British airborne forces. During Operation Tonga, the British airborne invasion of Normandy, Airspeed Horsa gliders landed among the wooden poles and suffered casualties. Some gliders were wrecked near Sainte-Mère-Église where Americans parachutists had also landed. Where encountered, British forces blew up the logs with dynamite and cleared landing fields for reinforcements.

On June 6, 1944, and afterward, most of the American airborne landings in Normandy were flown into areas that were not studded with Rommelspargel. Some flights, however, came up hard against the defense. Accompanying the 82nd Airborne Division, Tito Moruza landed on D-Day with orders to don civilian clothing and make his way to Paris to seize Gestapo papers. His glider hit a wooden pole defense which tore into the three soldiers sitting next to him, mortally wounding them. More casualties were inflicted during delivery of glider infantry reinforcements when some 16–18 gliders landed in a field of Rommelspargel and the troops that crawled from the wrecked gliders were immediately targeted by German small arms fire. Of 250 troops landing, some 50–60 survived.

Once Allied troops were on the ground, some German units used the Rommelspargel for defense, by cutting them down and using the logs to reinforce impromptu positions. Sturmmann Karl Vasold of the 12th SS Panzer Division Hitlerjugend described how his unit dug in under fire in a tank trench and foxholes on the road from Buron to Villons-les-Buissons, and used cut-down Rommelspargel poles to cover their positions and protect them from enemy fire.

=== Southern France ===
On June 29, 1944, German General of Infantry Friedrich Wiese was put in command of the French Riviera, where it was expected that the Allies would conduct an invasion of Vichy France. Wiese ordered Rommelspargel planted in vineyards and fields from Nice to Marseille. On August 15, Allied paratroopers and gliders of General Robert T. Frederick's mixed-nationality 1st Airborne Task Force landed in Operation Dragoon. One of the constituent units, the 551st Parachute Infantry Battalion, dropped on Draguignan, 42 kilometres (26 mi) from the coast. Some gliders were wrecked by Rommelspargel but more were destroyed by other obstacles such as trees, and by gliders landing atop one another. An officer in the 551st, Major "Pappy" Herrmann, saw the damage inflicted upon the gliders by the wooden poles and concluded for himself "I'll stick to parachutes."

In total, the wooden stakes caused about 300 casualties in the 1st Airborne Task Force.

== Atlantic Wall defenses ==
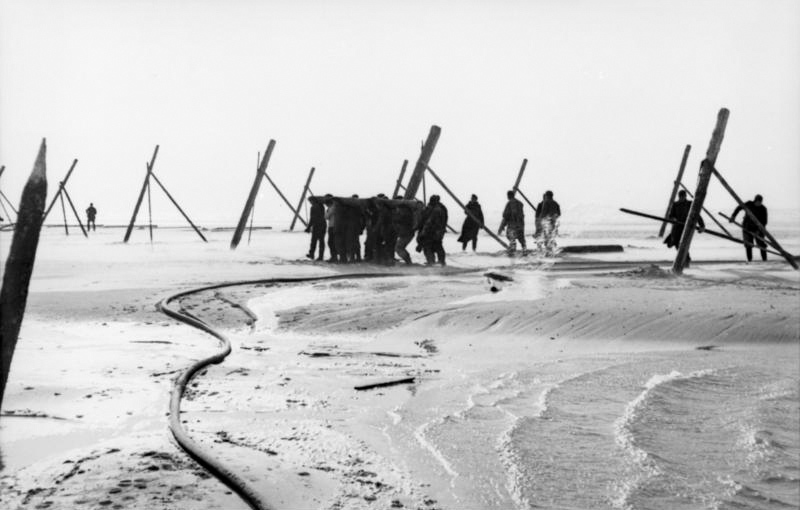
In 1943, troops used hydraulic pressure to emplace high wooden poles (Hochpfähle) in beach sand.

Before Rommel was assigned defense of the Atlantic Wall, obstacles to amphibious landing were being built upon the beaches of Belgium and France. On February 3, 1944, during a visit to the beach at Neufchâtel-Hardelot, Rommel was shown a method by which local troops employed a high pressure water hose to quickly create a hole in beach sand, one which could be used to set high wooden stakes (Hochpfähle) into the beach as an obstacle to landing craft. The water hose method took three minutes, fifteen times faster than using a pile driver. Rommel ordered such methods to be used to place wooden beams, metal rails and other obstructions along the beaches of Normandy. Nearly 11,000 were emplaced in the south part of Normandy's coastline where the Allies would eventually land.

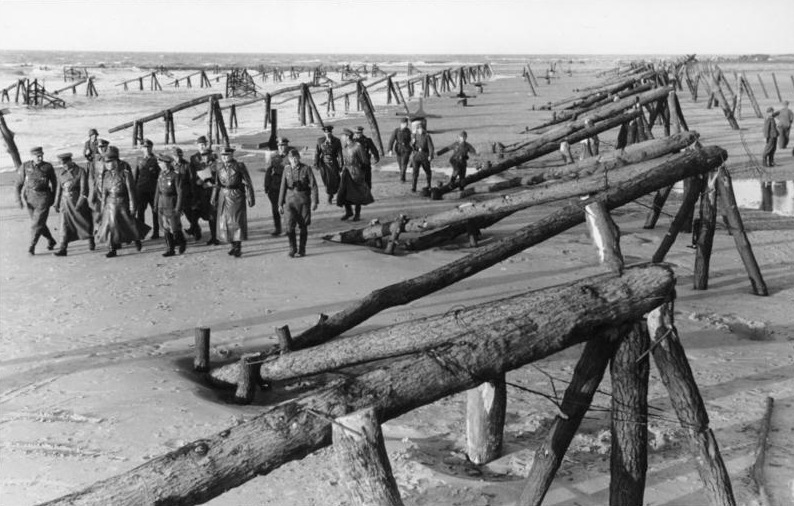
Rommel inspects an installation of obstruction beams (Hemmbalken) in April 1944

However, a test against the wooden stakes in mid-February showed them to be too weak to stop a captured British landing craft. As a result, a stronger design was contrived using a larger beam set at an angle and reinforced with other thick beams, most topped with a Teller mine. The more robust obstacles were called Hemmbalken, or "obstruction beams". The original upright beams were left in place – some were topped with mines for greater effectiveness. The Hochpfähle have sometimes been called "Rommel's asparagus" or Rommelspargel for their close resemblance to the air-landing obstructions.

U.S. Navy Commander Edward Ellsberg said of the various Atlantic Wall obstacles, "Rommel had thoroughly muddled our plans. Attacking at high tide as we had intended, we'd never get enough troops in over those obstacles...". Instead the Allies landed at low tide, which increased the length of the beach to be crossed but uncovered and revealed the obstacles, greatly reducing their effectiveness.
