= Cairon =

- Commune
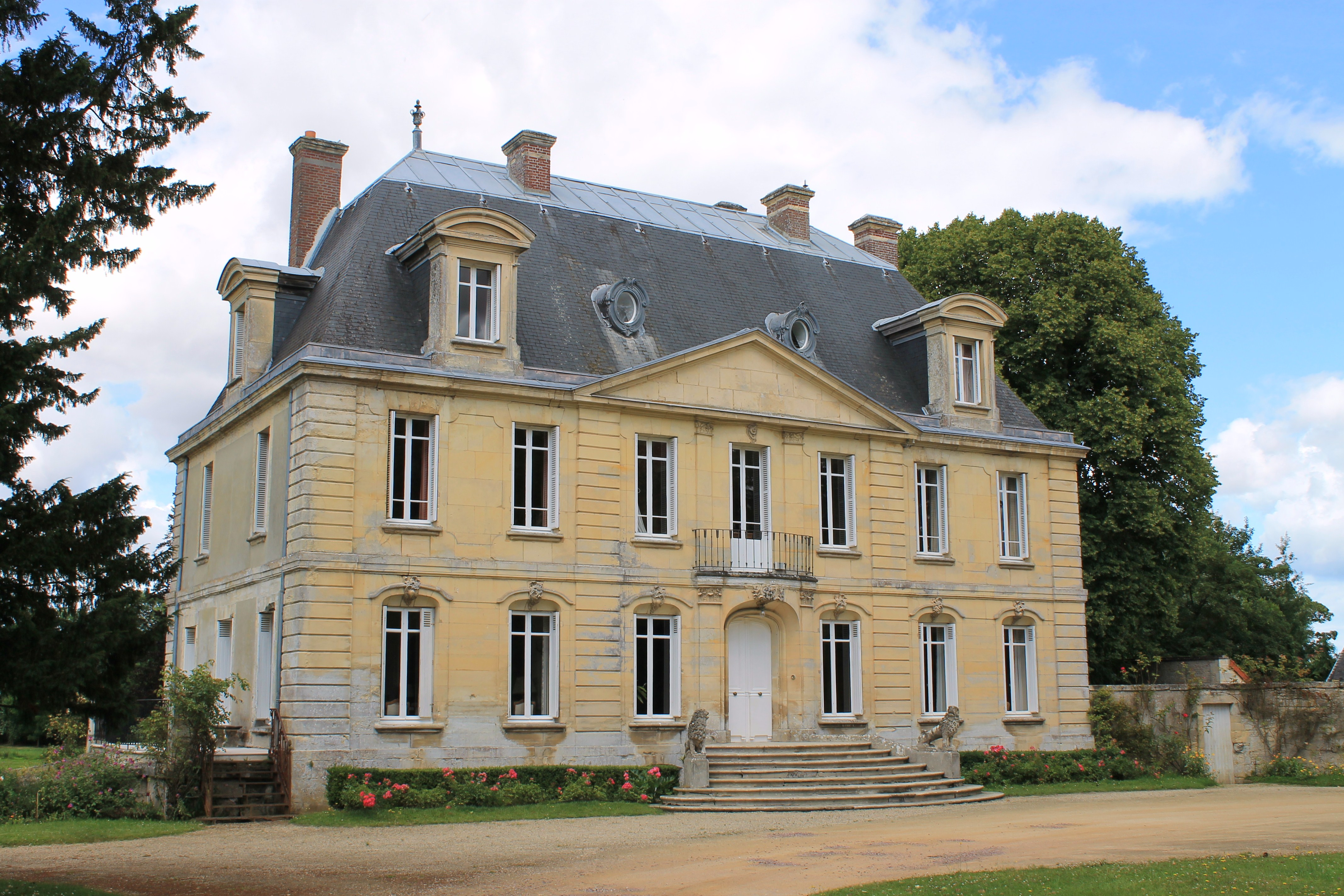
- Chateau

- Coat of arms
- Location of Cairon
- Location within France Location within Normandy
- Coordinates: 49°14′28″N 0°26′56″W
- Country: France
- Region: Normandy
- Department: Calvados
- Arrondissement: Caen
- Canton: Thue et Mue
- Intercommunality: CU Caen la Mer

Government
  - Mayor (2020–2026): Dominique Rouzic
- Area^{1}: 5.91 km^{2} (2.28 sq mi)
- Elevation: 85 m (279 ft)
- Highest elevation: 72 m (236 ft)
- Lowest elevation: 28 m (92 ft)
- Population (2023): 2,066
  - Density: 350/km^{2} (905/sq mi)
- Time zone: UTC+01:00 (CET)
  - Summer (DST): UTC+02:00 (CEST)
- INSEE/Postal code: 14123 /14610
- ^{1} French Land Register data, which excludes lakes, ponds, glaciers > 1 km^{2} (0.386 sq mi or 247 acres) and river estuaries.

Cairon (French pronunciation: [kɛʁɔ̃]) is a commune in the Calvados department in the Normandy region in northwestern France.

== Geography ==
The commune of Cairon is situated in Normandy, in Calvados, 5 kilometers to the north-west of Caen.

The Mue river and its tributary the Vey flow through Cairon.

== Toponymy ==
Cairon, Karon in 1077 and Cayron in 1231: the toponym was probably formed from the Gallo-Roman Carius by adding the suffix -onis.

== History ==
During the Invasion of Normandy, Cairon was liberated on 11 June 1944 by the 46th Royal Marine Commando.

The demonym (previously gentilic) is Caironnais.

== Population ==
Historical population
Year	Pop.	±% p.a.
1968	480	—
1975	664	+4.74%
1982	809	+2.86%
1990	1,098	+3.89%
1999	1,585	+4.16%
2007	1,573	−0.09%
2012	1,759	+2.26%
2017	1,987	+2.47%
2023	2,066	+0.65%
Source: INSEE

== See also ==
- Communes of the Calvados department
- Buron
- Jean-Luc Cairon (born 1962), French gymnast and coach
