= Buron =

Village in Calvados, France

Coordinates: 49°13′6″N 0°25′15″W

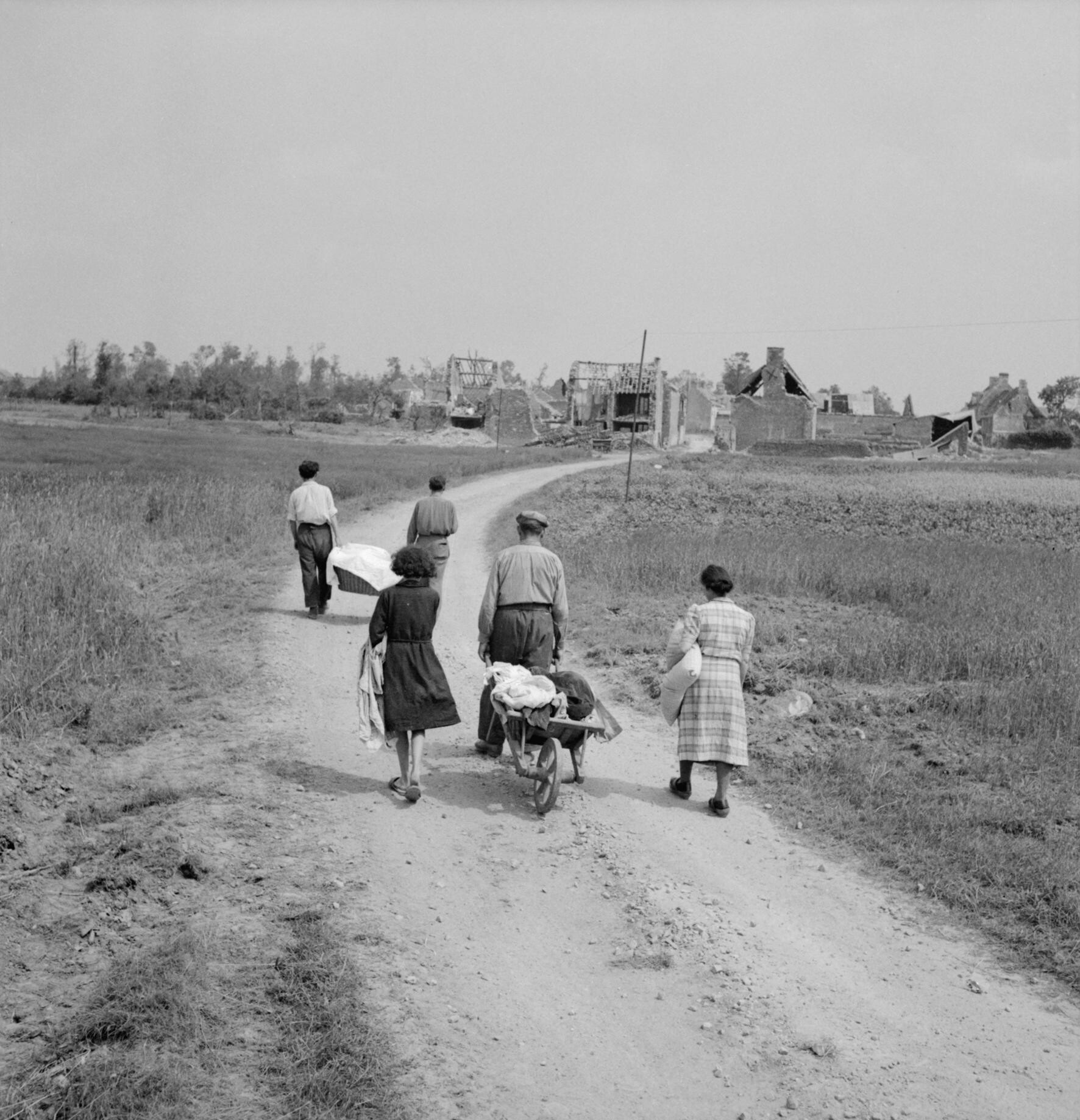
A French family returns to their village, Buron, on July 18, 1944; it was devastated during the Battle of Normandy.

Buron (French pronunciation: [byʁɔ̃]) is a village in France about 6 kilometres north-west of Caen, in the communes of Cairon, Rosel and Saint-Contest in Calvados.

== History ==
Buron is the site of two battles, one on June 7, 1944, and another during Operation Charnwood on July 8, 1944, when the Highland Light Infantry of Canada liberated the town from defending elements of the 12th SS Panzer Division.
