= 194th Glider Infantry Regiment =

- Shoulder Sleeve Insignia
- Active: 1942–1945
- Country: United States
- Branch: United States Army
- Type: Infantry
- Role: Glider infantry
- Motto: Aquilae Iuga Mortui
- Engagements: World War II; Battle of the Bulge; Operation Varsity

Commanders
- Notable commanders: James R. Pierce

Insignia
- The Glider Badge: Worn by U.S. Army airborne soldiers who rode gliders into combat

The 194th Glider Infantry Regiment was a Glider infantry regiment of the United States Army that served in World War II. It was a part of the 17th Airborne Division, and saw active combat service until its deactivation in 1945.

== History ==
Col. James R. Pierce c. 1944

The 194th Glider Infantry was constituted on 16 December 1942 as part of the Army of the United States, and was activated on 15 April 1943 at Camp Mackall, North Carolina under the command of COL James R. Pierce. The regiment was assigned to the 17th Airborne Division and began training for combat in the European Theater of Operations. They were stationed at the Tennessee Maneuver Area on 7 February 1944, and later sent to Camp Forrest, Tennessee on 24 March. Their tenure there was brief, and the regiment was sent to Camp Myles Standish, Massachusetts on 14 August. The 194th departed at Boston on 20 August 1944 and arrived in England on 28 August. The regiment began staging with the rest of the 17th Airborne Division at Camp Chisledon in Wiltshire, and trained for airborne, tactical, and night missions. When Operation Market Garden initiated, the 17th Airborne Division had not yet completed its training, and was used as a strategic reserve.

On 16 December 1944, the Wehrmacht launched a surprise attack on Allied positions, beginning the infamous Battle of the Bulge. The 17th Airborne Division was rushed to the front to assist the embattled defenders of Bastogne, and the men of the 194th Glider Infantry marched through the snow to relieve elements of the 28th Infantry Division, and set up Headquarters and defensive positions near the Belgian town of Morhet on 3 January 1945. General Patton ordered the division to capture Flamierge, and the 194th composed the right flank of the advance, with the 513th Parachute Infantry Regiment to their left. Under heavy mortar fire, the regiment attacked and captured their objectives despite considerable casualties. The 194th remained active on the line until they were relieved, and pulled back to camp at Chalons-sur-Marne in France on 11 February 1945. Here they began preparing for Operation Varsity, an airborne operation designed to help the surface assault troops secure a foothold across the Rhine River in Western Germany by landing two airborne divisions on the eastern bank of the Rhine near the village of Hamminkeln and the town of Wesel. The British 6th Airborne Division would capture Hamminkeln, and the US 17th Airborne Division would capture Wesel. Prior to the operation, on 1 March 1945, the remnants of the 193rd Glider Infantry Regiment and the 550th Airborne Infantry Battalion became the 194th GIR's 3rd Battalion.

The operation began on 24 March 1945, and the 194th GIR was the third wave of the 17th Airborne to assault. Troopers of the 194th GIR landed accurately in their landing zone, landing zone S, a large flat area north of Wesel where Issel River and Issel Canal merge. Their main objective was to seize the crossings over the Issel and protect the division's right flank. However, their gliders and tow aircraft took heavy casualties; 12 C-47 transports were lost due to anti-aircraft fire, and a further 140 were damaged by the same fire. The regiment landed in the midst of a number of German artillery batteries that were engaging Allied ground forces crossing the Rhine, and as such many of the gliders were engaged by German artillery pieces that had their barrels lowered for direct-fire. However, these artillery batteries and their crews were defeated by the glider-borne troops, and the 194th Glider Infantry Regiment was soon able to report that its objectives had been secured, having destroyed 42 artillery pieces, 10 tanks, 2 self-propelled anti-aircraft vehicles, 5 self-propelled guns, and captured 1,000 German POWs.

The 194th held its captured ground until 26 March, when Field marshal Bernard Montgomery began moving his troops eastward to relieve the paratroopers. The next day, the 194th advanced on the German town of Lembeck, but encountered solid enemy resistance and were repulsed after I Company attempted three abortive frontal assaults. The assaults were renewed on 28 March, and it was here that Technical Sergeant Clinton M. Hedrick, of I Co, earned the Medal of Honor. He repeatedly charged through heavy fire to attack German positions and alone followed a group of German soldiers when they retreated into a Schloss. When the Germans indicated that they wished to surrender, Hedrick and four other men entered the castle, only to be fired upon by a German self-propelled gun. Hedrick was fatally wounded, but successfully covered the withdrawal of his men with his BAR.

After Lembeck had been captured, the 194th drove eastward, and battled with retreating German units as they pushed further into the Nazi heartland. 1LT Thomas McKinley of the 194th captured one of the Nazi Party's top officials, Franz von Papen, in his estate near Essen in early April. McKinley rushed into the lodge to find von Papen having dinner with his family. McKinley pulled out a photograph and identified Papen. McKinley then told Papen that he was his prisoner; Papen stated in reply, "I don't know what the Americans would want with an old man of 65 like me!" Nonetheless, McKinley sat down and ate dinner with Papen before taking him captive. Papen was heard to remark (in English), "I wish this terrible war were over." SGT Fredericks, who was also present, responded, "So do 11 million other guys!"

Shortly after, the 194th was attached to the 95th Infantry Division from 5–13 April, and then returned to the 17th Airborne Division. The regiment served in the Army of Occupation in Germany from 2 May – 14 August 1945, and returned to the United States on 14 September 1945, and were deactivated at Camp Myles Standish, MA the same day.
