= 193rd Glider Infantry Regiment =

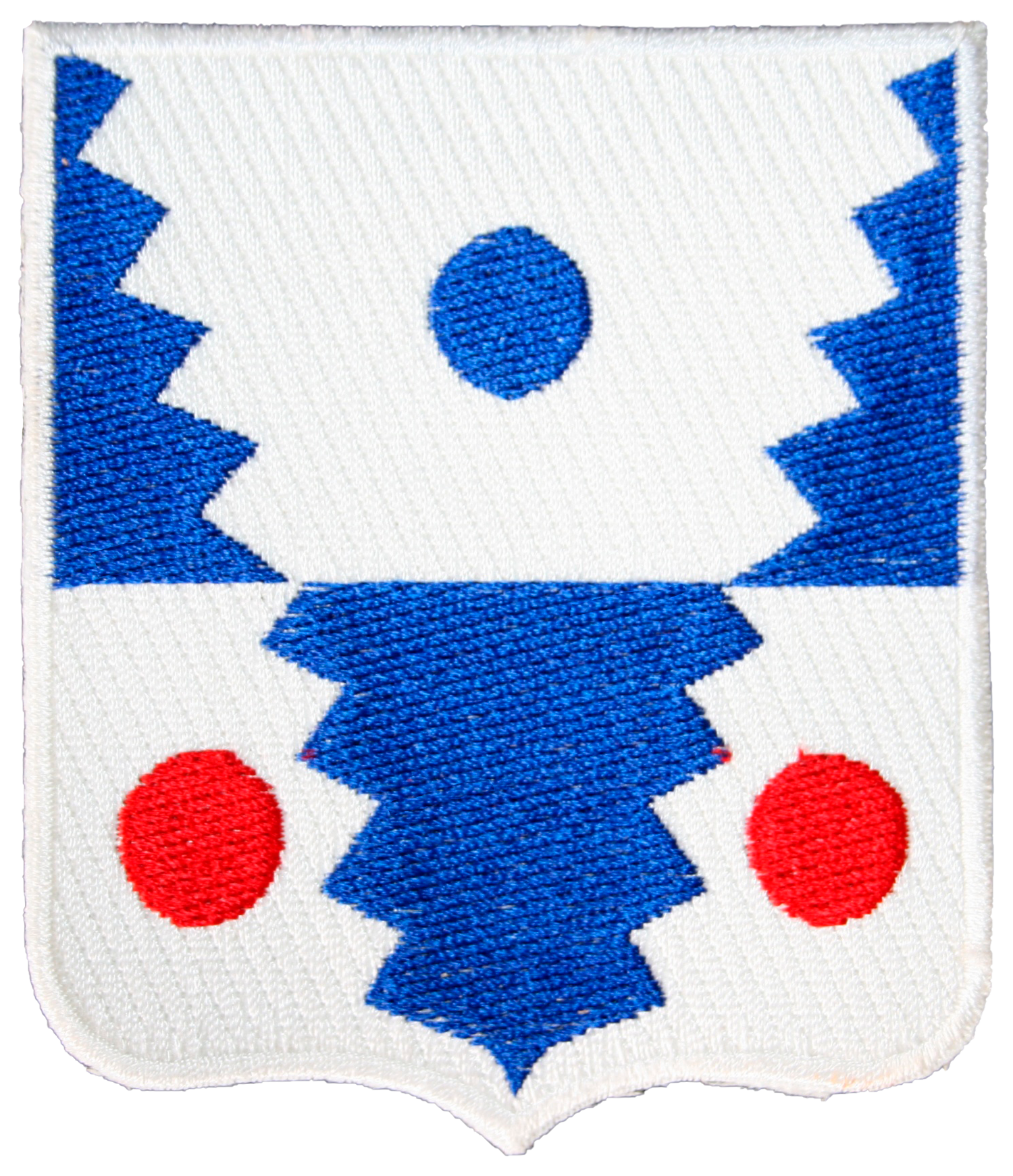
- Insignia of the 193rd Glider Infantry Regiment
- Active: 1942–1945
- Country: United States
- Branch: United States Army
- Type: Airborne
- Role: Glider infantry
- Size: Regiment
- Engagements: World War II

Commanders
- Notable commanders: Maurice G. Stubbs

The 193d Glider Infantry Regiment was an airborne infantry regiment of the United States Army during World War II. It was part of the 17th Airborne Division and fought during the Battle of the Bulge.

== Formation ==
The 193d Glider Infantry Regiment was constituted in the Army of the United States on 16 December 1942, and was activated at Camp Mackall, North Carolina on 15 April 1943 under the command of Colonel Maurice G. Stubbs. The regiment was assigned to the 17th Airborne Division and sailed to England in 1944 in preparation for fighting on the Western Front.

== World War II ==
During Operation Market Garden in September 1944, the 17th Airborne Division was held in reserve, and continued to train at Camp Chisleden in England. Almost three months later, on 16 December, the German Army launched a surprise attack, known as the Battle of the Bulge and the 17th Airborne Division, including the 193d Glider Infantry Regiment, were finally sent to combat. The 17th Airborne Division was attached to General George Patton's Third Army and ordered to immediately close in at Mourmelon-le-Grand Airfield. After taking over the defense of the Meuse River sector from Givet to Verdun on 25 December, the 17th Airborne Division moved to Neufchateau, Belgium, then marched through the snow to Morhet, relieving the 28th Infantry Division on 3 January 1945 and establishing a Division Command Post.

A howling blizzard with below freezing temperatures greeted the 193d on the morning of 4 January 1945. Patton had ordered the 17th Airborne Division to seize the town of Flamierge where the 11th Armored and the 87th Infantry Divisions had encountered brutal resistance from the Germans. Two regiments, the 513th Parachute Infantry on the right and the 194th Glider Infantry on the left attacked the town of Flamierge while the 193rd GIR and the 507th Parachute Infantry Regiment were held in reserve to counter an anticipated German panzer counterattack. In the ensuing days, the 193d GIR, as well as the rest of the 17th Airborne Division, would gain their baptism of fire that would have tested the mettle of the most experienced airborne units. The fighting was so intense that the area would forever be called "Dead Man's Ridge" because of the high casualty count sustained in order to take the strongly defended German emplacements.

By 11 January the German lines were crumbling and all of the 17th Airborne units regrouped except for the 193d which drove on with American armored units to seize the town of Houffalize. On 16 January the 193rd rejoined the rest of the 17th Airborne and relieved the 11th Armored Division in pursuit of the 9th Panzer Division, the Panzer Lehr Division, and the 26th Infantry Division. This took the 17th Airborne through Flamizoulle, Gives and on to Bertogne as the Germans continued retreating toward the Siegfried Line.

Beyond Bertogne, 193rd GIR split into "Task Force Stubbs" and "Task Force Bell" with the combined objective of seizing the town of Compogne and the high ground in its immediate vicinity. Turning east from that area the 193rd along with the 507th PIR led the continuing attack across Luxembourg to the Our River on the border of Germany. The German 5th Parachute Division made a vain attempt to maintain a bridgehead at the Our but the 507th managed to cross into Germany and probe the Siegfried Line.

The 17th Airborne Division was finally relieved by the 6th Armored Division and returned to camp at Chalons-sur-Marne in France on 11 February 1945. On 1 March 1945, the 193d Glider Infantry Regiment was disbanded in Belgium in a reorganization of the 17th Airborne Division's glider infantry from two, two-battalion regiments to one three-battalion regiment, a change that had been made before D-Day in the 82nd and 101st Airborne Divisions. Its assets, alongside those of the depleted 550th Airborne Infantry Battalion, which has suffered heavy casualties during the Battle of the Bulge, were used to form the 3rd Battalion, 194th Glider Infantry Regiment.
