= Roland L. Bragg =

US Army soldier (1923–1999)

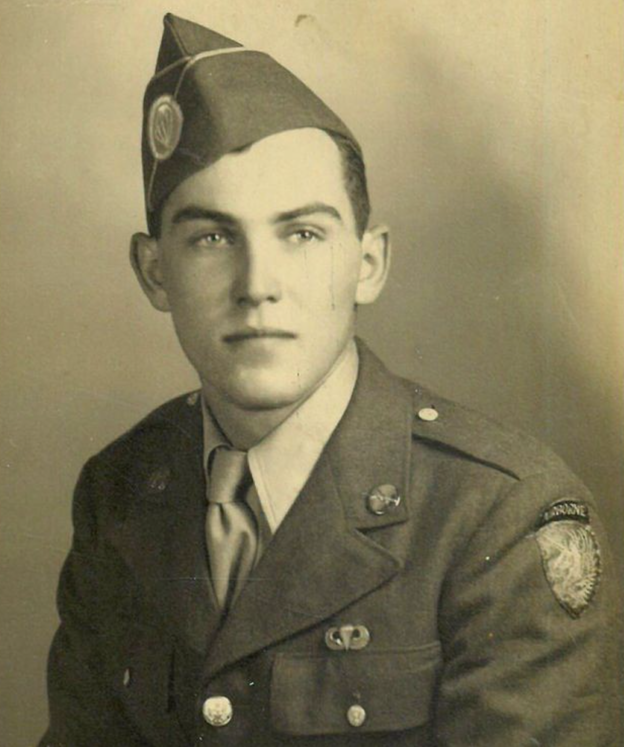
- Private First Class Roland L. Bragg in 1943
- Born: Roland Leon Bragg; June 11, 1923; Sabattus, Maine, U.S.
- Died: January 12, 1999 (aged 75); Nobleboro, Maine, U.S.
- Burial place: Dunbar Cemetery, Nobleboro, Maine, U.S.
- Spouse: Barbara Picinich (m. 1946)
- Children: 3
- Relatives: Val Picinich (father-in-law)
- Military career
- Allegiance: United States
- Branch: United States Army
- Service years: 1943–1945
- Rank: Private First Class
- Service number: 31-323-887
- Units: 513th Parachute Infantry Regiment; 17th Airborne Division
- Conflicts: World War II; Battle of the Bulge
- Awards: See list

Roland Leon Bragg (June 11, 1923 – January 12, 1999) was an American Army paratrooper during World War II. Bragg was awarded the Silver Star, the United States Army's third-highest military decoration for valor in combat, for "conspicuous gallantry and intrepidity in action." In 2025 the long-time name of Fort Bragg was restored as an eponym of Roland Bragg, two years after it had been renamed to Fort Liberty to avoid ties with Confederate general and slave owner Braxton Bragg.

== Early life and family ==
Bragg was born in 1923 in Sabattus, Maine, the son of Calvin Leroy Bragg and Ella Stevenson Bragg. His father served in the Army in World War I. As a boy during the Great Depression, Bragg helped pay the family mortgage by riding his bicycle twenty miles into resort towns to sell vegetables from his family's farm.

Bragg graduated from Waldoboro High School in 1943. On June 1, 1946, he married Barbara Picinich, whose father, Val Picinich, was a catcher for the Boston Red Sox. Bragg and his wife had three children and eleven grandchildren.

== World War II ==
Bragg enlisted in the U.S. Army in July 1943 and was stationed at Fort Bragg. He served as a toxic gas handler from July 1943 to November 1945. In August 1944 Bragg deployed to England. Bragg was a paratrooper in the Army with the rank of private first class, serving with the 513th Parachute Infantry Regiment, 17th Airborne Division during the Battle of the Bulge. Bragg took part in approximately 30 jumps during the war.

Bragg was briefly held prisoner by German troops at a German aid station. A German soldier recognized him as a fellow Mason and let him go.

Bragg was awarded the Silver Star for events in the Battle of the Bulge on January 7, 1945, when he, lightly wounded and accompanied by First Lieutenant McClain (a forward observer from the 466th Parachute Field Artillery Battalion), drove a captured German ambulance 20 miles (32 km) under enemy machine gun fire to an Allied hospital in Belgium. According to John Eisenhower's 1969 book The Bitter Woods, the ambulance was transporting one wounded American soldier who was killed when the ambulance was struck by enemy fire. According to a 1994 report, Bragg transported four wounded soldiers, saving at least one of the soldiers' lives. As a result of the enemy fire, Bragg was wounded in action with a light burn, but was able to return to Flamierge with a supply party later that night. According to his family, Bragg was offered a military promotion for his efforts, but he would not accept it.

== Later life ==
After returning home from military service, Bragg owned and operated an auto body shop and was the owner of Nobleboro Building Movers for 25 years. He was active in his local community, serving as a local selectman in Nobleboro, school committeeman in Nobleboro, volunteer firefighter, chairman of the local citizens committee, president of Nobleboro Grange, planning board member, and member of a historical preservation committee. He also volunteered with the Boy Scouts of America and Damariscotta American Legion. During his time serving as an elected member of the Nobleboro Select Board, Bragg was “instrumental” in the establishment of the Nobleboro-Jefferson Transfer Station.

In the 1970s Bragg's company was hired to aid in the historic restoration of Granite Hall Block. In 1974 Bragg successfully maneuvered a precariously positioned tractor-trailer carrying 27,000 pounds of tuna and swordfish off the dock of the Muscongus Bay Fisheries plant in Moxie Cove, Round Pond, a process that took six hours; he was credited with saving thousands of pounds of cargo. In 1975 he donated his services to move the historic First Baptist Church of Nobleboro to its current location, and aided in its restoration. In 1978 he led efforts for the rebuilding of the Five Islands Wharf in Georgetown after a severe storm.

After retiring in 1984, Bragg ran a portable sawmill business. In 1986 he faced a lawsuit from clients whose house had been damaged in Bragg's earlier moving of their house, and were unsatisfied with the payment provided by insurance. In 1988 Bragg helped lead celebrations of Nobleboro's bicentennial which occurred during his tenure as selectman. This included a formal flag presentation and ceremony with Governor of Maine John R. McKernan Jr. In 1993 Bragg and his wife donated a portion of the land which became the local baseball field and boat launch in Nobleboro, which ensured public access to Pemaquid Pond.

=== Reunion ===
Bragg lived with post-traumatic stress disorder after his military service. He did not know if he had saved his friend in the war until 1993, when he received a letter from John Martz, a soldier he had saved that day, writing that he was forever grateful to him. The two men reunited at Martz's home in California. Their reunion, where they reminisced and looked at a wartime photo album, was attended by reporters and photographers.

== Death ==
Bragg died of cancer on January 12, 1999, at the age of 75. He received a funeral with full Masonic honors and is interred at Dunbar Cemetery in Nobleboro, Maine.

== Legacy and honors ==
In 1945 Bragg was awarded the Silver Star for "conspicuous gallantry and intrepidity in action." He was also a recipient of the Purple Heart, World War II Victory Medal, the Army Good Conduct Medal, the European African Middle Eastern Campaign Medal with three bronze stars, a Parachute Badge, and a Combat Infantry Badge. His name is listed as an honoree on the World War II Memorial's federal online registry.

=== Fort Bragg ===
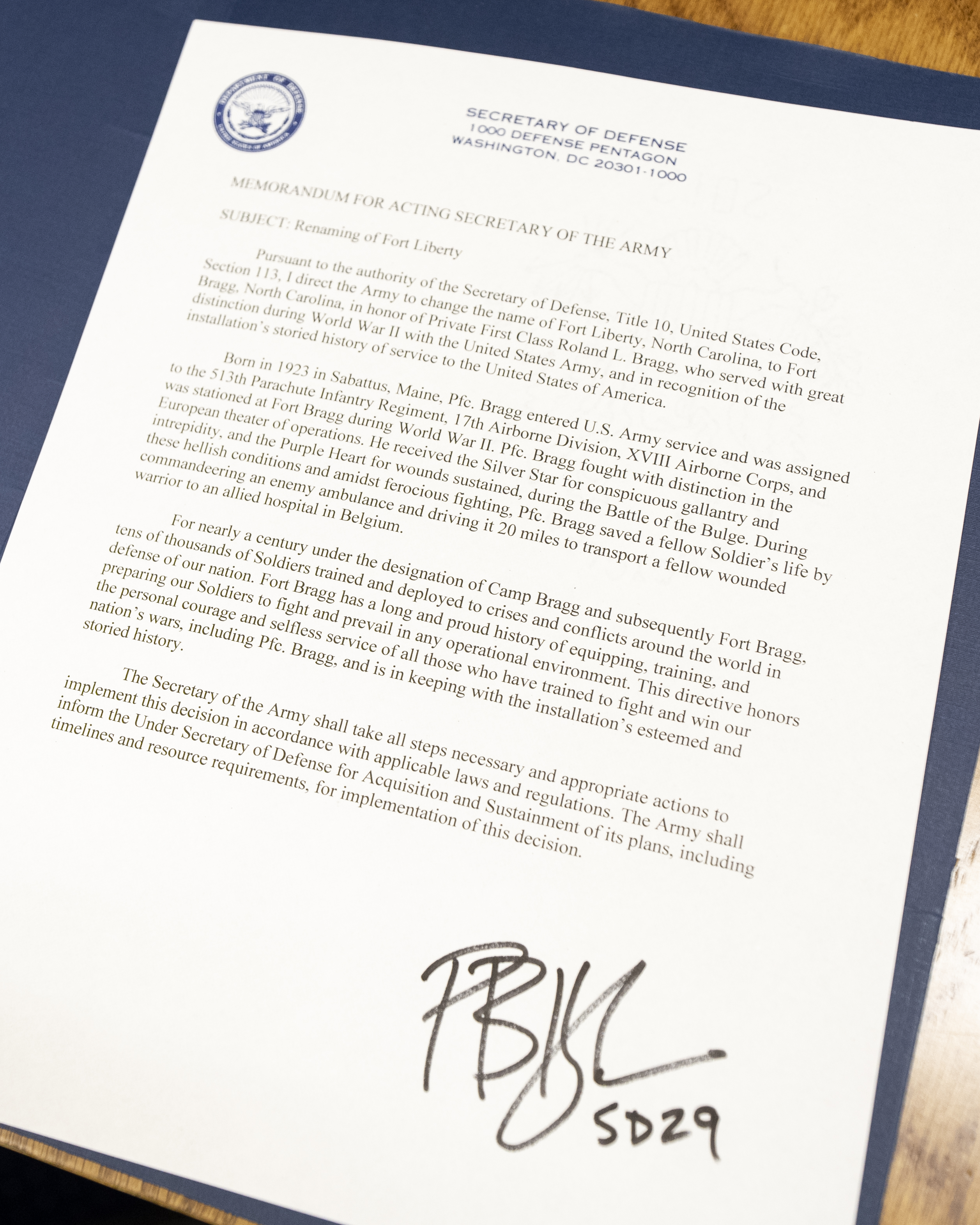
Memorandum signed by Secretary of Defense Pete Hegseth renaming Fort Liberty to Fort Bragg in honor of Roland L. Bragg

Fort Bragg was originally named for Confederate general and slave owner Braxton Bragg, until it was renamed to "Fort Liberty" in 2023, due to an act of Congress that prohibited naming federal installations after Confederate officials. Roland L. Bragg's name was one of thousands submitted by the public before the naming commission's decision. In February 2025 U.S. Secretary of Defense Pete Hegseth issued a memorandum restoring the name "Fort Bragg", this time honoring Private First Class Bragg, rather than the original eponym.

A formal base redesignation ceremony was held at Fort Bragg on March 7, 2025, with members of Bragg's family, military leaders, and elected officials in attendance.

== In popular culture ==
The story of Bragg and First Lieutenant McClain using a captured German ambulance to get wounded soldiers to an Allied hospital was recounted in John Eisenhower's 1969 book about the Battle of the Bulge titled The Bitter Woods.

A 1999 Reunions Magazine article recounting veterans’ memories also celebrated Bragg's "heroic drive" in the Bulge, including a grateful quote from the soldier whose life he saved.

The WRAL Daily Download podcast aired an episode on February 12, 2025, which featured Bragg's biography and highlighted his military service. The History Shorts podcast aired an episode in 2025 highlighting Bragg's biography. A February 2025 episode of North Carolina Public Radio's Due South discussed Bragg's life and biography, including his capture and other activities during the Battle of the Bulge.

In March 2025 the U.S. Army produced a documentary tribute video about the life of Bragg. An exhibit about Bragg which includes his uniform and medals is on display at the Airborne & Special Operations Museum.

== Works cited ==
=== Books ===
- Eisenhower, John S. D. (1969). The Bitter Woods. G. P. Putnam's Sons. ISBN 978-0-89839-106-0.
