= Clinton M. Hedrick =

United States Army Medal of Honor recipient

- Born: May 1, 1918; Cherry Grove, West Virginia
- Died: March 28, 1945 (aged 26) near Lembeck, Germany
- Burial place: North Fork Memorial Cemetery, Riverton, West Virginia
- Military career
- Allegiance: United States
- Branch: United States Army
- Service years: 1940–1945
- Rank: Technical Sergeant
- Unit: 194th Glider Infantry Regiment
- Conflicts: World War II
- Awards: Medal of Honor

Clinton M. Hedrick (May 1, 1918 – March 28, 1945) was a United States Army soldier and a recipient of the United States military's highest decoration the Medal of Honor for his actions in World War II during Operation Varsity. Not long after his actions he died of his wounds.

== Biography ==
Hedrick joined the Army from Riverton, West Virginia in September 1940, and by March 27, 1945, was serving as a technical sergeant in Company I, 194th Glider Infantry Regiment, 17th Airborne Division. On that day and the next, near Lembeck, Germany, he repeatedly charged through heavy fire to attack German positions and alone followed a group of German soldiers when they retreated into a castle. When the Germans indicated that they wished to surrender, Hedrick and four other men entered the castle, only to be fired upon by a German self-propelled gun. Hedrick was fatally wounded, but successfully covered the withdrawal of his men. For these actions, he was posthumously awarded the Medal of Honor seven months later, on October 19, 1945.

Hedrick, aged 26 at his death, was buried in North Fork Memorial Cemetery, Riverton, West Virginia.

== Medal of Honor citation ==
Technical Sergeant Hedrick's official Medal of Honor citation reads:

He displayed extraordinary heroism and gallantry in action on 27 – March 28, 1945, in Germany. Following an airborne landing near Wesel, his unit was assigned as the assault platoon for the assault on Lembeck. Three times the landing elements were pinned down by intense automatic weapons fire from strongly defended positions. Each time, T/Sgt. Hedrick fearlessly charged through heavy fire, shooting his automatic rifle from his hip. His courageous action so inspired his men that they reduced the enemy positions in rapid succession. When 6 of the enemy attempted a surprise, flanking movement, he quickly turned and killed the entire party with a burst of fire. Later, the enemy withdrew across a moat into Lembeck Castle. T/Sgt. Hedrick, with utter disregard for his own safety, plunged across the drawbridge alone in pursuit. When a German soldier, with hands upraised, declared the garrison wished to surrender, he entered the castle yard with 4 of his men to accept the capitulation. The group moved through a sally port, and was met by fire from a German self-propelled gun. Although mortally wounded, T/Sgt. Hedrick fired at the enemy gun and covered the withdrawal of his comrades. He died while being evacuated after the castle was taken. His great personal courage and heroic leadership contributed in large measure to the speedy capture of Lembeck and provided an inspiring example to his comrades. A monumental tablet is placed on the Lembeck Castle entrance gate in 2022 initiated by Dutch researcher and Battlefield tourguide Jos Bex with financial support of the US 17th Airborne Association.

== Awards and decorations ==

Badge	Combat Infantryman Badge		
1st row	Medal of Honor		Bronze Star Medal
2nd row	Purple Heart	Army Good Conduct Medal	American Defense Service Medal
3rd row	American Campaign Medal	European–African–Middle Eastern Campaign Medal with 1 campaign star	World War II Victory Medal
Badge	Parachutists Badge		

== See also ==
- List of Medal of Honor recipients
- List of Medal of Honor recipients for World War II
