= 17th Airborne Division Artillery =

- Active: 1942–46; 1948–49
- Country: United States
- Branch: United States Army
- Type: Field artillery
- Role: Division artillery
- Size: Brigade
- Part of: 17th Airborne Division
- Equipment: M1 75mm pack howitzer, M3 105mm howitzer

Commanders
- Commander: Joseph V. Phelps, 1942–46

The 17th Airborne Division Artillery is an inactive field artillery unit of the United States Army, active from 1942–1946 and from 1948–1949. The unit served with the 17th Airborne Division in World War II, and saw action in Belgium and Germany, including participating in Operation Varsity. The unit was reactivated again from 1948–1949, but was not deployed.

== Lineage and honors ==
=== Lineage ===
- Constituted 16 December 1942 in the Army of the United States as Headquarters and Headquarters Battery, 17th Airborne Division Artillery.
- Activated 15 April 1943 at Camp Mackall, North Carolina.
- Inactivated 14 September 1945 at Camp Myles Standish, Massachusetts.
- Allotted 25 June 1948 to the Regular Army. Activated 6 July 1948 at Camp Pickett, Virginia.
- Inactivated 10 June 1949 at Camp Pickett, Virginia.

Unofficial

=== Campaign participation credit ===
- World War II: Rhineland, Ardennes-Alsace, Central Europe (with arrowhead)

Unofficial
