= Joint Airborne Troop Board =

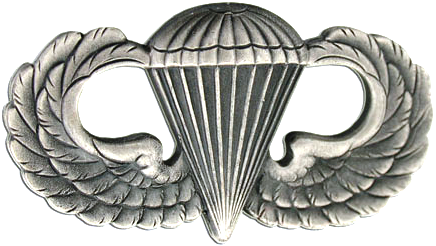
- United States Army Basic Parachutist Badge
- Active: 1951—1956
- Country: United States of America
- Type: Joint board
- Role: Creation of doctrine, tactics, techniques, and procedures

Commanders
- First director: William M. Miley (1951—?)
- Director: Robert F. Sink (1954—1955)

The Joint Airborne Troop Board was a multi-service US military board tasked with creating doctrine, tactics, techniques, and procedures for joint airborne operations and aerial logistical support operations. It was one of several boards that existed during the early years of the United States Department of Defense. The board existed from 1951 to 1956.

== Background ==
In March and April 1948, the Key West Agreement outlining the division of air assets between the Army, Navy, and Air Force, was drafted by the Secretary of Defense James V. Forrestal and approved by President Harry S Truman. By April 1950, the Army airborne community was expressing an interest in transport helicopters. A panel chaired by Major General William M. Miley reported that troop parachutes were unsatisfactory in part because of the problems encountered in assembling scattered troops after an airdrop. The panel recommended the adoption of convertiplanes and heavy lift helicopters.

On 26 April 1951, the Joint Chiefs of Staff approved the first two chapters of Joint Action Armed Forces. On 19 September 1951, the United States Departments of the Army, Navy, and Air Force jointly published the Joint Action Armed Forces Manual (Army: FM 110–5, Navy: FAAF, Air Force: AFM 1-1). That manual tasked the United States Army with operating a joint airborne troop board.

== Army members ==
- Major General William M. Miley, U.S. Army
- Major General Albert Pierson, U.S. Army
- Lieutenant General Robert Sink, U.S. Army

== Activities ==
The board was located at Fort Bragg, North Carolina. It first sat in 1951, its establishment with Major General Miley as director pre-dating the formal publication of FM 110–5; the board was a successor to the Army Airborne Center. It last sat in 1956.

George Marvin Johnson, Jr. (later a major general in the U.S. Air Force) opined that the efforts of the Joint Airborne Troop Board led to the replacement of the C-47 transport by the C-130 transport.

Major General John DeForest Barker, U.S. Air Force, opined that the failure of the Joint Airborne Troop Board and the other joint boards was not remarkable because they had been tasked to resolve at a lower organizational level problems which could not be resolved at as higher level.
