= Operation Varsity =

1945 Allied airborne operation in WWII

- Part of Operation Plunder
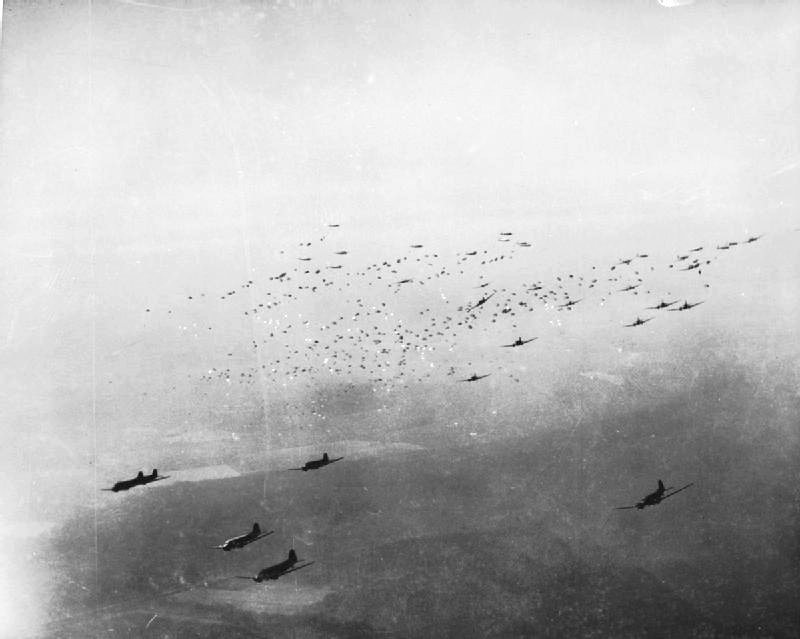
- C-47 transport aircraft drop hundreds of paratroopers as part of Operation Varsity.
Date	24 March 1945
Location	North of Wesel, Germany 51°42′09″N 06°36′09″E
Result	Allied victory

Belligerents
United States; United Kingdom; Canada	Germany

Commanders and leaders
Matthew B. Ridgway; William M. Miley; Eric Bols	(Nazi Germany) Wolfgang Erdmann (Nazi Germany) Heinz Fiebig

Units involved
XVIII Airborne Corps; 17th Airborne Div.; 6th Airborne Div.; 1st Canadian Parachute Battalion	7th Parachute Div. 84th Infantry Div.

Strength
16,870 (Note: 17th Airborne landed 9,650 men, and 6th Airborne landed 7,220 men.)	8,000 (est.) (Note: Otway claims that Allied intelligence placed 7 Parachute Division and 84 Infantry Division at around 4,000 men each after having suffered heavy casualties in previous campaigns, these being the two German formations facing the Allied airborne forces.)

Casualties and losses
2,378–2,700 casualties (Note: Ellis puts British 6th Airborne Division losses as 1,400 dead, wounded or captured and places the U.S. 17th Airborne Division losses as 1,300 dead, wounded or captured. The official Parachute Regiment website places 6th Airborne losses at 1,078 killed or wounded.); 72 aircraft (Note: Over 1,700 aircraft were employed during the airlift of the airborne forces, of which 56 planes were lost. A further 240 planes flew a resupply mission following the glider landings; 16 planes were shot down. Of the 1,300 gliders employed during the operation, under 4% were destroyed.)	Unknown total casualties 3,500 captured

Operation Varsity (24 March 1945) was a successful airborne forces operation launched by Allied forces toward the end of World War II. Involving more than 16,000 paratroopers and several thousand aircraft, it is the largest airborne operation ever conducted on a single day and in one location. (Note: The airborne component of Operation Market Garden was a larger operation, but the drop zones were split over three distinct areas and spread over several days. Operation Varsity was conducted on a single day in one location and was the largest such single airborne operation in history.)

Varsity was part of Operation Plunder, the Anglo-American-Canadian effort, led by Field Marshal Bernard Montgomery, to cross the northern Rhine River and from there enter Northern Germany. To help British ground forces secure a foothold across the Issel and Rhine rivers in western Germany, Varsity landed two airborne divisions on the Rhine's eastern bank near the village of Hamminkeln and the town of Wesel.

Varsity called for dropping a British and an American paratroop division, both of U.S. XVIII Airborne Corps, under Major General Matthew B. Ridgway, behind enemy lines in order to capture key territory and generally disrupt German defenses to aid an advance of Allied ground forces. The British 6th Airborne Division was to capture the villages of Schnappenberg and Hamminkeln, clear part of the Diersfordter Wald (Diersfordt Forest) of German forces, and secure three bridges over the River Issel. The U.S. 17th Airborne Division was to capture the village of Diersfordt and clear the rest of the Diersfordter Wald of German forces. The paratroop divisions were to hold the territory they captured until relieved by advancing units of 21st Army Group, and then join in a subsequent general advance into northern Germany.

The operation suffered from several mistakes. Due to pilot error, paratroopers of the 513th Parachute Infantry Regiment, a regiment of the U.S. 17th Airborne Division, missed their drop zone and landed on a British drop zone instead.

Still, the operation was a success: the paratroopers captured Rhine bridges and secured towns that could have been used by German forces to delay the advance of British ground forces. The two paratroop divisions incurred more than 2,000 casualties, but they captured about 3,500 German soldiers and imposed an unknown number of casualties on opposing forces. The operation was the last large-scale Allied airborne operation of World War II and was one of the last European operations of WWII, as the war in Europe ended in early May, just six weeks later.

== Background ==
The Allied disposition in western Europe by March 1945

By March 1945, the Allied armies had advanced into Germany and had reached the River Rhine. The Rhine was a formidable natural obstacle to the Allied advance, but if breached would allow the Allies to access the North German Plain and ultimately advance on Berlin and other major cities in Northern Germany. Following the Broad Front approach laid out by General Eisenhower, the Supreme Allied Commander of the Allied Expeditionary Force, it was decided to attempt to breach the Rhine in several areas. Field Marshal Sir Bernard Montgomery, commanding the Anglo-Canadian 21st Army Group, devised Operation Plunder, subsequently authorized by Eisenhower, for a Rhine crossing by the forces under his command. Plunder envisioned the British Second Army, under Lieutenant-General Miles C. Dempsey, and the U.S. Ninth Army, under Lieutenant General William Simpson, crossing the Rhine at Rees, Wesel, and an area south of the Lippe Canal.

To ensure that the operation was a success, Montgomery insisted that an airborne component be inserted into the plans for the operation, to support the amphibious assaults that would take place; this was code-named Operation Varsity. Three airborne divisions were initially chosen to participate in the operation, these being the British 6th Airborne Division, the U.S. 13th Airborne Division and the U.S. 17th Airborne Division, all of which were assigned to U.S. XVIII Airborne Corps, commanded by Major General Matthew B. Ridgway. One of these airborne formations, the British 6th Airborne Division, commanded by Major-General Eric Bols, was a veteran division; it had taken part in Operation Overlord, the assault on Normandy in June the previous year. However, the U.S. 17th Airborne Division, under Major General William Miley, had been activated only in April 1943 and had arrived in Britain in August 1944, after Operation Overlord had taken place. The division did not participate in Operation Market Garden. It did, however, participate in the Ardennes campaign but had yet to take part in a combat drop. The U.S. 13th Airborne Division, under Major General Eldridge Chapman, had been activated in August 1943 and was transferred to France in 1945; the formation itself had never seen action, although one of its regiments, the 517th Parachute Infantry, had fought briefly in Italy, and later in Southern France and the Ardennes campaign.

== Prelude ==
=== Allied preparation ===
Operation Varsity was planned with these three airborne divisions in mind, with all three to be dropped behind German lines in support of the 21st Army Group as it conducted its amphibious assaults to breach the Rhine. During the earliest planning stages, it became apparent that the 13th Airborne Division would be unable to participate in the operation, as there were only enough combat transport aircraft in the area to transport two divisions effectively. The operation was then altered to accommodate the two remaining airborne divisions, the British 6th and U.S. 17th Airborne Divisions. The two airborne divisions would be dropped behind German lines, with their objective to land around Wesel and disrupt enemy defences in order to aid the advance of the British Second Army towards Wesel.

"To disrupt the hostile defence of the RHINE in the WESEL sector by the seizure of key terrain by airborne attack, in order [...] to facilitate the further offensive operations of the SECOND ARMY."

— Operational orders for 6th and 17th Airborne Divisions

To achieve this, both divisions would be dropped near the village of Hamminkeln, and were tasked with a number of objectives: they were to seize the Diersfordter Wald, a forest that overlooked the Rhine, including a road linking several towns together; several bridges over a smaller waterway, the River Issel, were to be seized to facilitate the advance; and capture the village of Hamminkeln. The Diersfordter Wald was chosen by Lieutenant-General Dempsey, the British Second Army commander, as the initial objective because its seizure would deny the Germans artillery positions from which they could disrupt Second Army's bridging operations. Once these objectives were taken, the airborne troops would consolidate their positions and await the arrival of Allied ground forces, defending the territory captured against German forces known to be in the area.

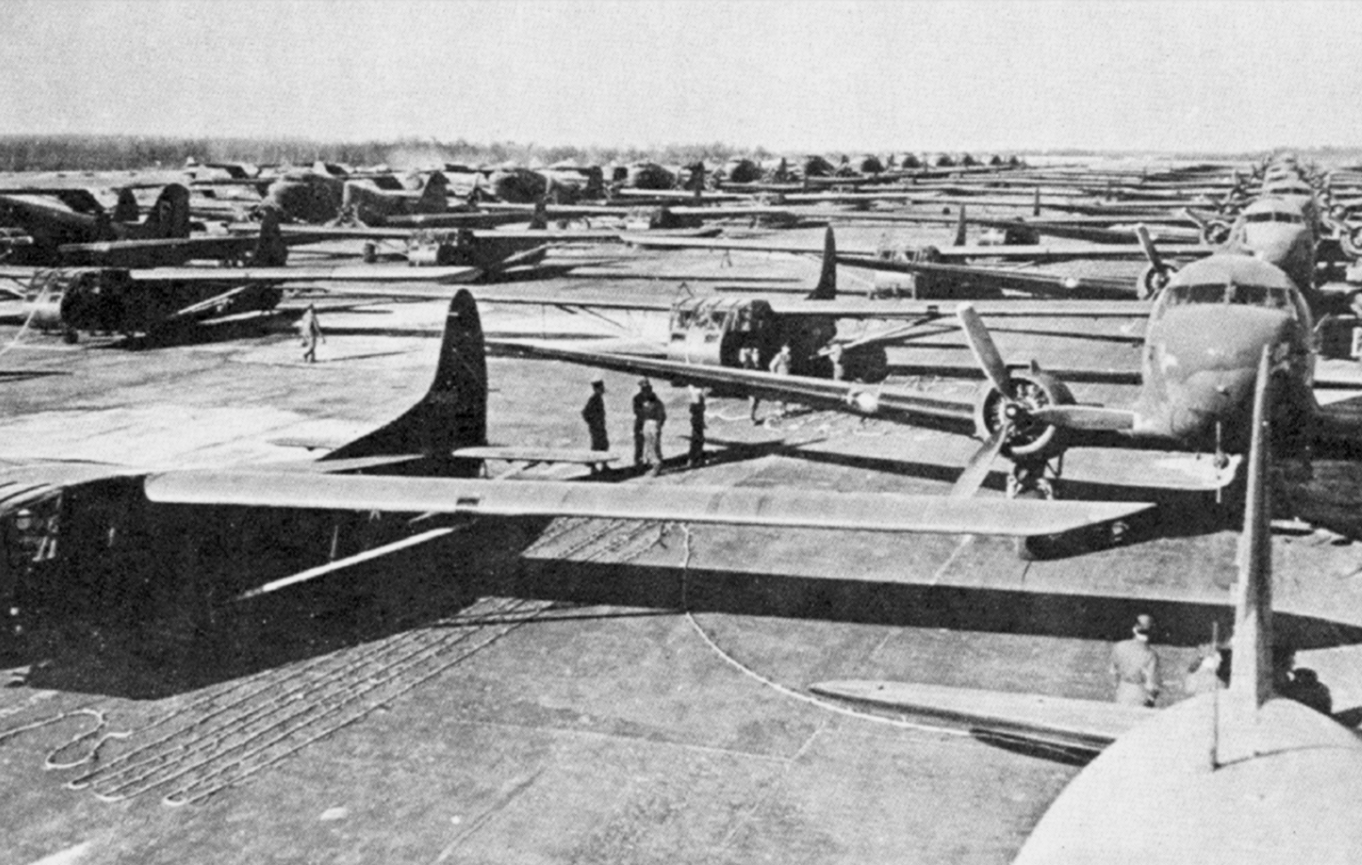
C-47s and CG-4A gliders before take-off, 24 March 1945

Operation Varsity would be the largest single-lift airborne operation conducted during the conflict; more significantly, it would contradict previous airborne strategy by having the airborne troops drop after the initial amphibious landings, in order to minimize the risks to the airborne troops learned from the experiences of Operation Market Garden, the attempt to capture the Rhine bridges in the Netherlands in 1944. Unlike Market Garden, the airborne forces would be dropped only a relatively short distance behind German lines, thereby ensuring that reinforcements in the form of Allied ground forces would be able to link up with them within a short period: this avoided risking the same type of disaster that had befallen the British 1st Airborne Division when it had been isolated and practically annihilated by German infantry and armour at Arnhem. It was also decided by the commander of the First Allied Airborne Army, General Lewis H. Brereton, who commanded all Allied airborne forces, including U.S. XVIII Airborne Corps, that the two airborne divisions participating in Operation Varsity would be dropped simultaneously in a single "lift", instead of being dropped several hours apart, addressing what had also been a problem during Operation Market Garden. Supply drops for the airborne forces would also be made as soon as possible to ensure adequate supplies were available to the airborne troops as they fought.

=== German preparation ===
By this period of the conflict, the number of German divisions remaining on the Western Front was rapidly declining, both in numbers and quality, a fact in the Allies' favour. By the night of 23 March, Montgomery had the equivalent of more than 30 divisions under his command, while the Germans fielded around 10 divisions, all weakened from constant fighting. The best German formation the Allied airborne troops would face was the 1st Parachute Army, although even this formation had been weakened from the losses it had sustained in earlier fighting, particularly when it had engaged Allied forces in the Reichswald Forest in February. First Parachute Army had three corps stationed along the river; the II Parachute Corps to the north, LXXXVI Army Corps in the centre, and LXIII Army Corps in the south. Of these formations, the II Parachute Corps and LXXXVI Corps had a shared boundary that ran through the proposed landing zones for the Allied airborne divisions, meaning that the leading formation of each corps—these being the 7th Parachute and 84th Infantry Divisions—would face the airborne assault. After their retreat to the Rhine both divisions were under-strength and did not number more than 4,000 men each, with 84th Infantry Division supported by only 50 or so medium artillery pieces.

The seven divisions that formed the 1st Parachute Army were short of manpower and munitions, and although farms and villages were well prepared for defensive purposes, there were few mobile reserves, ensuring that the defenders had little way to concentrate their forces against the Allied bridgehead when the assault began. The mobile reserves that the Germans did possess consisted of some 150 armoured fighting vehicles under the command of 1st Parachute Army, the majority of which belonged to XLVII Panzer Corps. Allied intelligence believed that of the two divisions that formed XLVII Panzer Corps, the 116th Panzer Division had up to 70 tanks, and the 15th Panzergrenadier Division 15 tanks and between 20–30 assault guns. Intelligence also pointed to the possibility of a heavy anti-tank battalion being stationed in the area. Also, the Germans possessed a great number of antiaircraft weapons; on 17 March Allied intelligence estimated that the Germans had 103 heavy and 153 light anti-aircraft guns, a number which was drastically revised a week later to 114 heavy and 712 light anti-aircraft guns. The situation of the German defenders, and their ability to counter any assault effectively, was worsened when the Allies launched a large-scale air attack one week prior to Operation Varsity. The air attack involved more than 10,000 Allied sorties and concentrated primarily on Luftwaffe airfields and the German transportation system. The German defenders were also hampered by the fact that they had no reliable intelligence as to where the actual assault would be launched; although German forces along the Rhine had been alerted as to the general possibility of an Allied airborne attack, it was only when British engineers began to set up smoke generators opposite Emmerich and began laying a 60-mile (97 km) long smokescreen that the Germans knew where the assault would come.

== Battle ==
Planned drop zones for Operation Varsity

Operation Plunder began at 9 pm on the evening of 23 March, and by the early hours of the morning of 24 March Allied ground units had secured a number of crossings on the eastern bank of the Rhine. In the first few hours of the day, the transport aircraft carrying the two airborne divisions that formed Operation Varsity began to take off from airbases in England and France and began to rendezvous over Brussels, before turning northeast for the Rhine dropping zones. The airlift consisted of 541 transport aircraft containing airborne troops, and a further 1,050 troop-carriers towing 1,350 gliders. The U.S. 17th Airborne Division consisted of 9,387 personnel, who were transported in 836 C-47 Skytrain transports, 72 C-46 Commando transports, and more than 900 Waco CG-4A gliders. The British 6th Airborne Division consisted of 7,220 personnel transported by 42 Douglas C-54 and 752 C-47 Dakota transport aircraft, as well as 420 Airspeed Horsa and General Aircraft Hamilcar gliders. This immense armada stretched more than 200 miles (322 km) in the sky and took 2 hours and 37 minutes to pass any given point, and was protected by some 2,153 Allied fighters from the U.S. Ninth Air Force and the Royal Air Force. The combination of the two divisions in one lift made this the largest single day airborne drop in history. At 10 am British and American airborne troops belonging to the 6th Airborne Division and 17th Airborne Division began landing on German soil, some 13 hours after the Allied ground assault began.

=== 6th Airborne Division ===
The first element of the British 6th Airborne Division to land was the 8th Parachute Battalion, part of the 3rd Parachute Brigade under Brigadier James Hill. The brigade actually dropped nine minutes earlier than scheduled, but successfully landed in drop zone A, while facing significant small-arms and 20 mm anti-aircraft fire. The brigade suffered a number of casualties as it engaged the German forces in the Diersfordter Wald, but by 11:00 hours the drop zone was all but completely clear of enemy forces and all battalions of the brigade had formed up.

The key place of Schnappenberg was captured by the 9th Parachute Battalion in conjunction with the 1st Canadian Parachute Battalion.

The 1st Canadian Parachute Battalion lost its Commanding Officer (CO), Lieutenant Colonel Jeff Nicklin, to German small-arms fire only moments after he landed. Despite taking casualties, the brigade cleared the area of German forces, and by 13:45 Brigadier Hill reported that the brigade had secured all of its objectives. At great personal danger, Canadian medical orderly Corporal Frederick George Topham recovered casualties and took them for treatment, despite his own wounds. He was later awarded the Victoria Cross for his efforts.

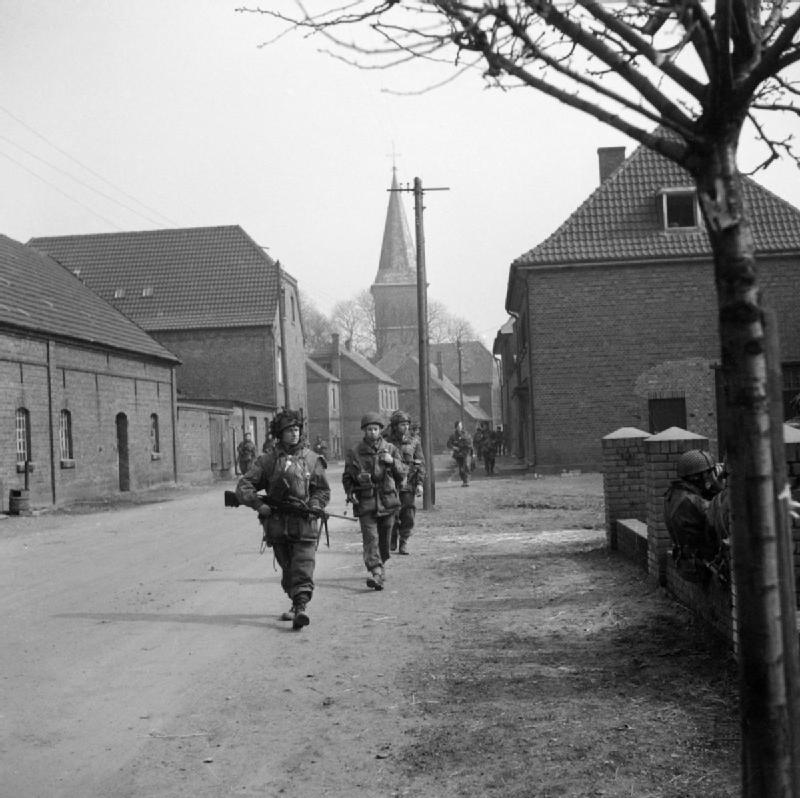
British paratroopers in Hamminkeln, 25 March 1945

The next British airborne unit to land was the 5th Parachute Brigade, commanded by Brigadier Nigel Poett. The brigade was designated to land on drop zone B and achieved this, although not as accurately as 3rd Parachute Brigade due to poor visibility around the drop zone, which also made it more difficult for paratroopers of the brigade to rally. The drop zone came under heavy fire from German troops stationed nearby, and was subjected to shellfire and mortaring which inflicted casualties in the battalion rendezvous areas. However, the 7th Parachute Battalion soon cleared the DZ of German troops, many of whom were situated in farms and houses, and the 12th Parachute Battalion and 13th Parachute Battalion rapidly secured the rest of the brigade's objectives. The brigade was then ordered to move due east and clear an area near Schermbeck, as well as to engage German forces gathered to the west of the farmhouse where the 6th Airborne Division Headquarters was established. By 15:30 Brigadier Poett reported that the brigade had secured all of its objectives and linked up with other British airborne units.

The third airborne unit that formed a part of the 6th Airborne Division was the 6th Airlanding Brigade, commanded by Brigadier Hugh Bellamy. The brigade was tasked with landing in company-sized groups and capturing several objectives, including the town of Hamminkeln. The gliders containing the airborne troops of the brigade landed in landing zones P, O, U and R under considerable antiaircraft fire, the landing being made even more difficult due to the presence of a great deal of haze and smoke. This resulted in a number of glider pilots being unable to identify their landing areas and losing their bearings; a number of gliders landed in the wrong areas or crashed. However, the majority of the gliders survived, allowing the battalions of the brigade to secure intact the three bridges over the River Issel that they had been tasked with capturing, as well as the village of Hamminkeln with the aid of American paratroopers of the 513th Parachute Infantry Regiment, which had been dropped by mistake nearby. The brigade secured all of its objectives shortly after capturing Hamminkeln.

=== 17th Airborne Division ===
The 507th Parachute Infantry Regiment, under the command of Colonel Edson Raff, was the lead assault formation for the 17th Airborne Division, and was consequently the first American airborne unit to land as part of Operation Varsity. The entire regiment was meant to be dropped in drop zone W, a clearing 2 miles (3 km) north of Wesel; however, excessive ground haze confused the pilots of the transport aircraft carrying the regiment, and as such when the 507th dropped it split into two halves. Colonel Raff and approximately 690 of his paratroopers landed northwest of the drop zone near the town of Diersfordt, with the rest of the regiment successfully landing in drop zone W. The colonel rallied his separated paratroopers and led them to drop zone W, engaging a battery of German artillery en route, killing or capturing the artillery crews before reuniting with the rest of the regiment. By 2 pm, the 507th PIR had secured all of its objectives and cleared the area around Diersfordt, having engaged numerous German troops and also destroying a German tank. The actions of the 507th Parachute Infantry during the initial landing also gained the division its second Medal of Honor, when Private George Peters posthumously received the award after charging a German machine gun nest and eliminating it with rifle fire and grenades, allowing his fellow paratroopers to gather their equipment and capture the regiment's first objective.

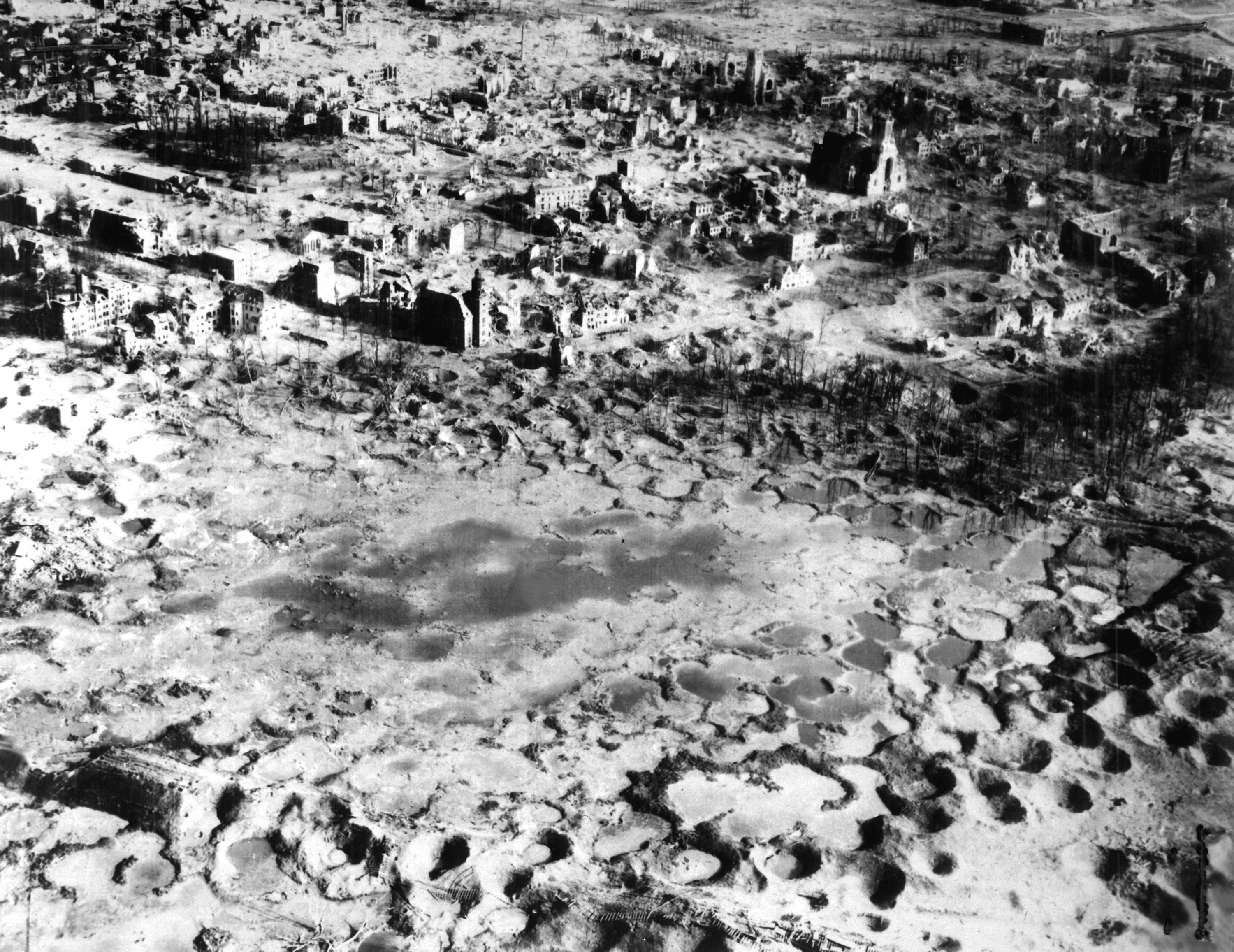
The city of Wesel lies in ruin after Allied bombardment.

The 513th Parachute Infantry Regiment was the second American airborne unit to land after the 507th, under the command of Colonel James Coutts. En route to the drop zone, the transport aircraft carrying the 513th had the misfortune to pass through a belt of German antiaircraft weapons, losing 22 of the C-46 transport aircraft and damaging a further 38. Just as the 507th had, the 513th also suffered from pilot error due to the ground haze, and as such the regiment actually missed its designated drop zone, DZ X, and was dropped on one of the landing zones designated for the British 6th Airlanding Brigade. Despite this inaccuracy the paratroopers swiftly rallied and aided the British glider-borne troops who were landing simultaneously, eliminating several German artillery batteries that were covering the area. Once the German troops in the area had been eliminated, a combined force of American and British airborne troops stormed Hamminkeln and secured the town. By 2 pm, Colonel Coutts reported to Divisional Headquarters that the 513th Parachute Infantry had secured all of its objectives, having knocked out two tanks and two complete regiments of artillery during their assault. During its attempts to secure its objectives, the regiment also gained a third Medal of Honor for the 17th Airborne Division when Private First Class Stuart Stryker posthumously received the award after leading a charge against a German machine-gun nest, creating a distraction to allow the rest of his platoon to capture the fortified position in which the machine-gun was situated.

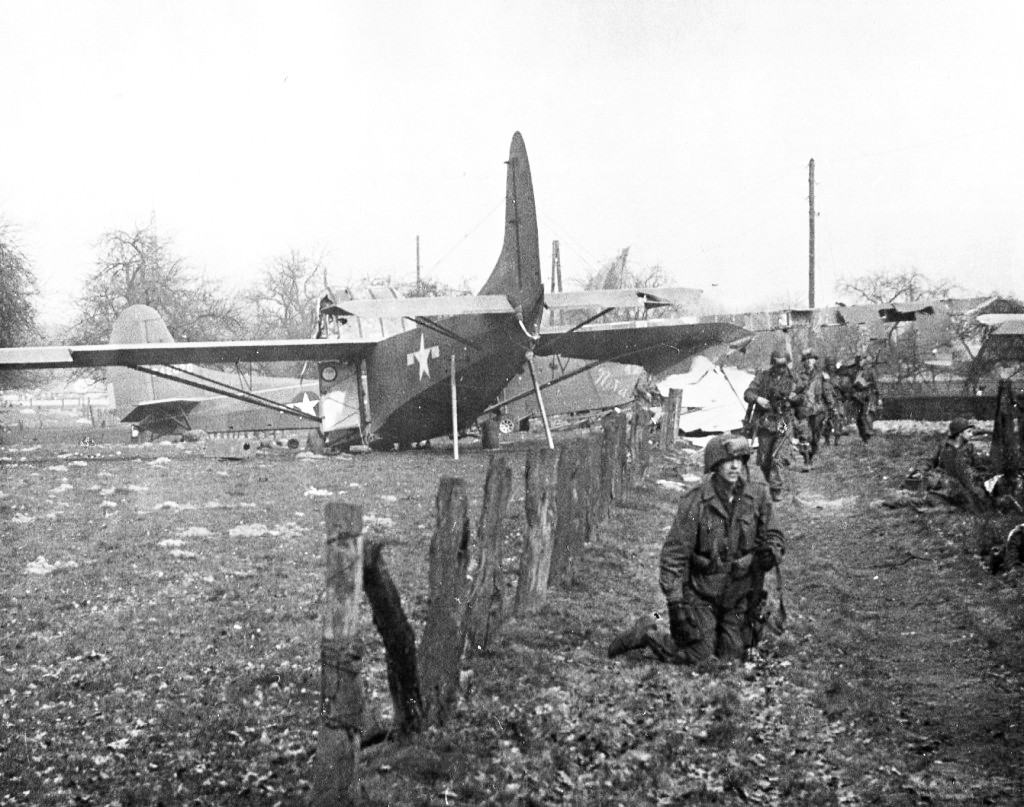
American glider troops of the 194th Glider Infantry Regiment after landing near Wesel

The third component of the 17th Airborne Division to take part in the operation was the 194th Glider Infantry Regiment (GIR), under the command of Colonel James Pierce. Troopers of the 194th GIR landed accurately in landing zone S, but their gliders and tow aircraft took heavy casualties; 12 C-47 transports were lost due to anti-aircraft fire, and a further 140 were damaged by the same fire. The regiment landed in the midst of a number of German artillery batteries that were engaging Allied ground forces crossing the Rhine, and as such many of the gliders were engaged by German artillery pieces that had their barrels lowered for direct-fire. However, these artillery batteries and their crews were defeated by the glider-borne troops, and the 194th Glider Infantry Regiment was soon able to report that its objectives had been secured, having destroyed 42 artillery pieces, 10 tanks, 2 self-propelled anti-aircraft vehicles and 5 self-propelled guns.

== OSS teams ==
The Office of Strategic Services sent four teams of two (codename Algonquin, teams Alsace, Poissy, S&S and Student), with Operation Varsity to infiltrate and report from behind enemy lines, but none succeeded. Team S&S had two agents in Wehrmacht uniforms and a captured Kϋbelwagen; to report by radio. But the Kϋbelwagen was put out of action while in the glider; three tires and the long-range radio were shot up (German gunners were told to attack the gliders not the tow planes).

== Aftermath ==
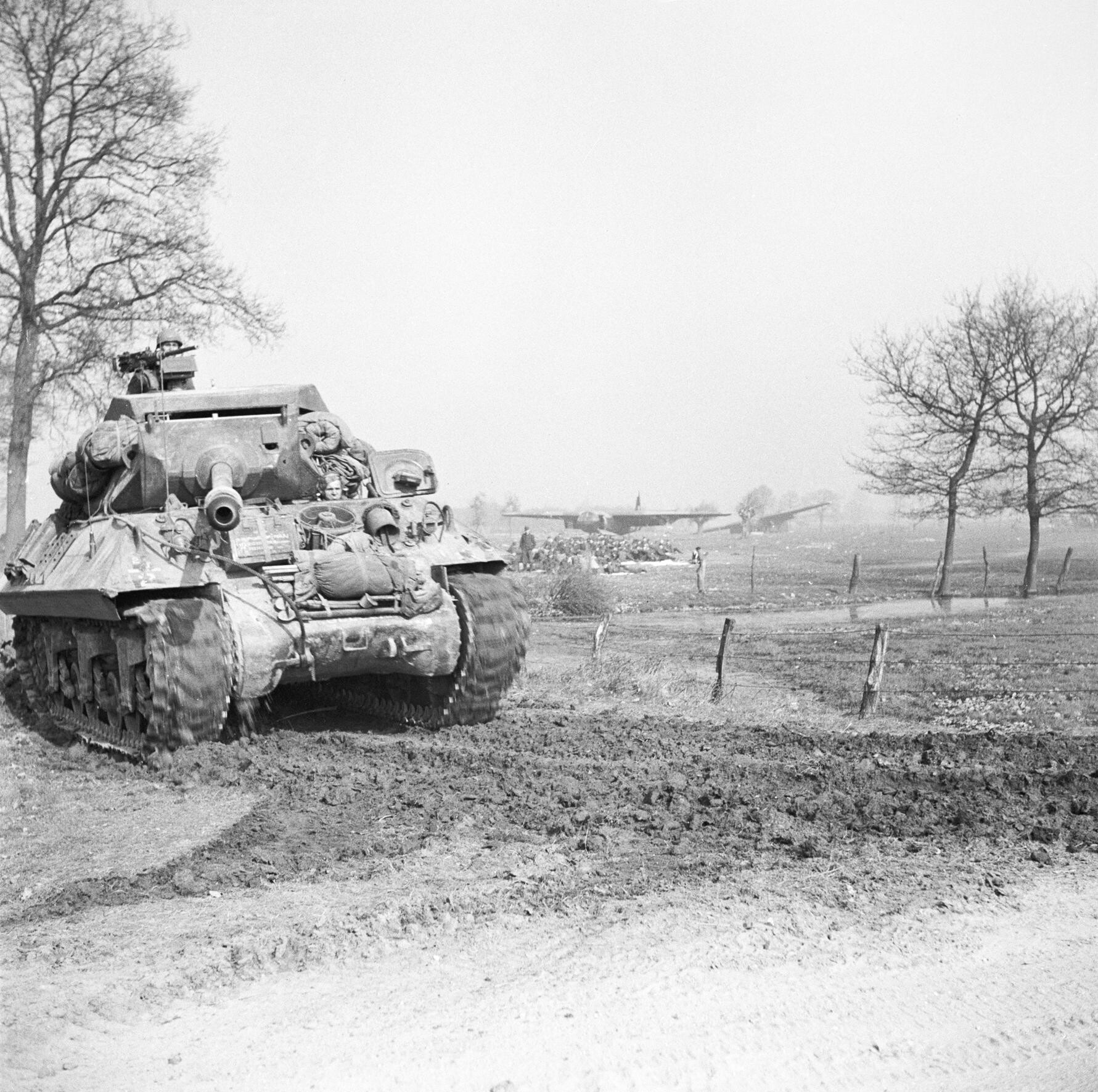
An Achilles tank destroyer on the east bank of the Rhine moves up to link with airborne forces whose abandoned Horsa gliders can be seen in the background.

Operation Varsity was a successful large-scale airborne operation. All of the objectives that the airborne troops had been tasked with had been captured and held, usually within only a few hours of the operation beginning. The bridges over the Issel were captured, although one later had to be destroyed to prevent its capture by counter-attacking German forces. The Diersfordter Forest was cleared of enemy troops, and airborne troops cut the roads through which the Germans might have routed reinforcements to oppose the ground advance. Hamminkeln, the village that dominated the area and through which any advance would be made, was secured by air-lifted units.

By nightfall of 24 March, 15th (Scottish) Infantry Division had joined up with elements of 6th Airborne, and by midnight the first light bridge was across the Rhine. By 27 March, twelve bridges suitable for heavy armour had been installed over the Rhine and the Allies had 14 divisions on the east bank of the river and penetrating as much as 10 miles (16 km). According to Generalmajor Heinz Fiebig, commanding officer of one of the defending German formations, 84th Infantry Division, the German forces defending the area, was greatly surprised by the speed with which the two airborne divisions landed. He said their sudden appearance had a "shattering effect" on the greatly outnumbered defenders. He revealed during his interrogation that his division had been badly depleted and could muster barely 4,000 soldiers.

The U.S. 17th Airborne Division gained its fourth Medal of Honor in the days following the operation, when Technical Sergeant Clinton M. Hedrick of the 194th Glider Infantry Regiment received the award posthumously after aiding in the capture of Lembeck Castle, which German forces had turned into a fortified position.

=== Casualties ===
Both airborne formations suffered quite heavy casualties, although lighter than had been expected. By nightfall of 24 March, the 6th Airborne Division had suffered around 1,400 casualties killed, wounded or missing in action out of the 7,220 personnel who were landed in the operation. The division said that it captured around 1,500 prisoners of war.

The 17th Airborne Division suffered a similar casualty rate, reporting around 1,300 casualties out of 9,650 personnel who took part in the operation between 24 and 29 March. Its commanders said that it had taken 2,000 POWs, for a total of around 3,500 POWs for both airborne formations. 56 aircraft were lost during 24 March, 21 out of the 144 transport aircraft transporting the 17th Airborne were shot down, 59 were damaged by anti-aircraft fire, and 16 bombers from the Eighth Air Force were shot down during supply drops.

=== Battle honours ===
In the British and Commonwealth system of battle honours, there was no distinct award for service in Operation Varsity. Instead, units that participated in the operation were included in the awards made between 1956 and 1959 to all units that participated in the Rhine crossing between 23 March and 1 April 1945: Rhine, or The Rhine to Canadian units, later translated to Le Rhin for French Canadian units.

== Post-war praise ==
Contemporary observers and historians generally agree that Operation Varsity was successful. General Eisenhower called it "the most successful airborne operation carried out to date", and an observer later wrote that the operation showed "the highest state of development attained by troop-carrier and airborne units". In the official summary of the operation, Major General Ridgway wrote that the operation had been flawless, and that the two airborne divisions involved had destroyed enemy defences that might otherwise have taken days to reduce, ensuring the operation was successful.

Several modern historians have also praised the operation and the improvements that were made for Varsity. G. G. Norton argued that the operation benefited from the lessons learned from previous operations, and Brian Jewell agrees, arguing that the lessons of Market Garden had been learned as the airborne forces were concentrated and quickly dropped, giving the defenders little time to recover. Norton also argues that improvements were made for supporting the airborne troops; he notes that a large number of artillery pieces were available to cover the landings and that observers were dropped with the airborne forces, thus augmenting the firepower and flexibility of the airborne troops. He also highlights the development of a technique that allowed entire brigades to be landed in tactical groups, giving them greater flexibility. Dropping the airborne forces after the ground forces had breached the Rhine also ensured that the airborne troops would not have to fight for long before being relieved, a major improvement on the manner in which the previous large-scale airborne operation, Market Garden, had been conducted.

Historian Peter Allen states that while the airborne forces took heavy casualties, Varsity diverted German attention from the Rhine crossing onto themselves. Consequently, the troops fighting to create a bridgehead across the Rhine suffered relatively few casualties, and were able to "break out from the Rhine in hours rather than days".

== Post-war criticism ==
Despite a great deal of official accolade and praise over the success of the operation, a number of criticisms have been made of the operation and the errors that were made. Several military historians have been critical of the need for the operation, with one historian, Barry Gregory, arguing that "Operation Varsity was not entirely necessary...". Another historian, James A. Huston, argues that "...had the same resources been employed on the ground, it is conceivable that the advance to the east might have been even more rapid than it was". In The Last Offensive, the US Army official history of the operation, Charles B. MacDonald (1990) asked "whether under the prevailing circumstances an airborne attack (was) necessary or .. even justified."

=== Aircraft shortages ===
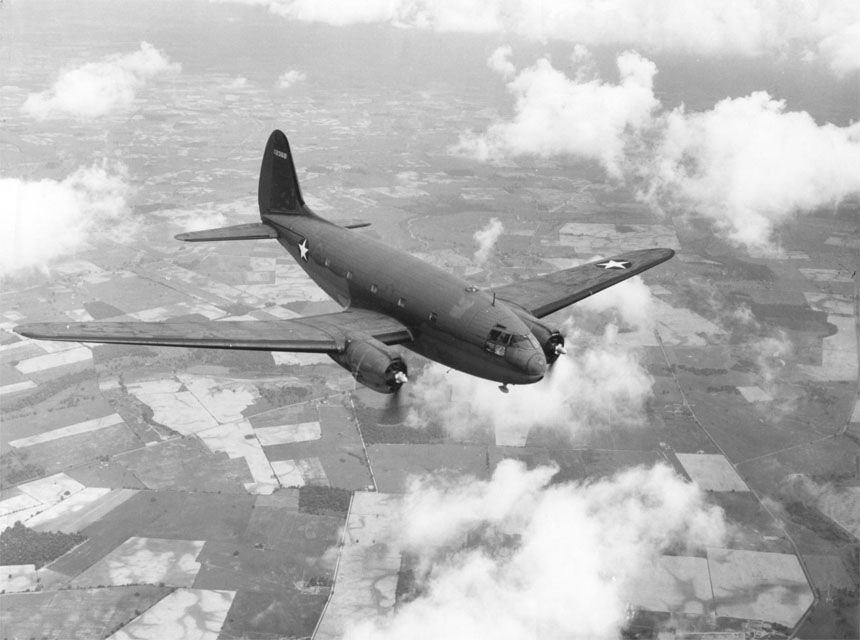
Curtiss C-46 "Commando" in flight

One specific failure in the massive operation was the critical lack of transport aircraft for the operation, an issue that had dogged every large-scale airborne operation the Allies had conducted. In the original planning for Varsity, an extra airborne division, the 13th, had been included; however, a lack of transport aircraft to drop this division led to it being excluded from the final plan. In consequence a third of the troops planned to be used were discarded, weakening the fighting power of the airborne formation. In the event the airborne troops actually employed were enough to overwhelm the defenders.

There was also a shortage of gliders, although Brereton eventually got the 906 CG-4As he needed for Varsity and 926 for Operation Choker II, an American crossing of the Rhine at Worms planned for March. New gliders were shipped crated from America for assembly in Europe. Some were recovered from the Netherlands despite pilfering for fabric and instruments and a storm which destroyed over a hundred; after two months only 281 of the 2000 gliders there were retrieved. There was little recovery of gliders from Normandy.

Some historians have commented on this failure; Gerard Devlin argues that because of this lack of aircraft the remaining two divisions were forced to shoulder the operation by themselves.

=== Aircraft and troop losses ===
Losses of airborne troops were high, probably due to the operation being launched in full daylight, rather than at night. The landings were conducted during the day primarily because the planners believed that a daytime operation had a better chance of success than at night as the troops would be less scattered. (Note: Brereton recommended a daylight operation because in his judgment Luftwaffe fighter opposition by day, consisting of a handful of jets, was less a threat than the German night-fighter force. Also, conditions at four of the nine glider-mission airfields on the continent made them unsuitable for glider operations at night.)

However, landing paratroopers, and especially gliders, without the cover of darkness left them exceedingly vulnerable to anti-aircraft fire. The official history of the British Airborne Divisions highlights the cost of this trade-off, stating that of the 416 gliders that landed, only 88 remained undamaged by enemy fire, and that between 20–30 percent of the glider pilots were casualties. Another historian argues that the gliders landing in daylight was a calamity, with the 194th Glider Infantry Regiment having two-thirds of their gliders hit by ground fire and suffering heavy casualties as they landed. The casualty rates were worsened by the slow rates of release and descent of the gliders themselves, and by each aircraft towing two gliders, slowing them even further; as the time to release a glider unit was 3–4 times longer than a parachute unit, the gliders were vulnerable to flak.

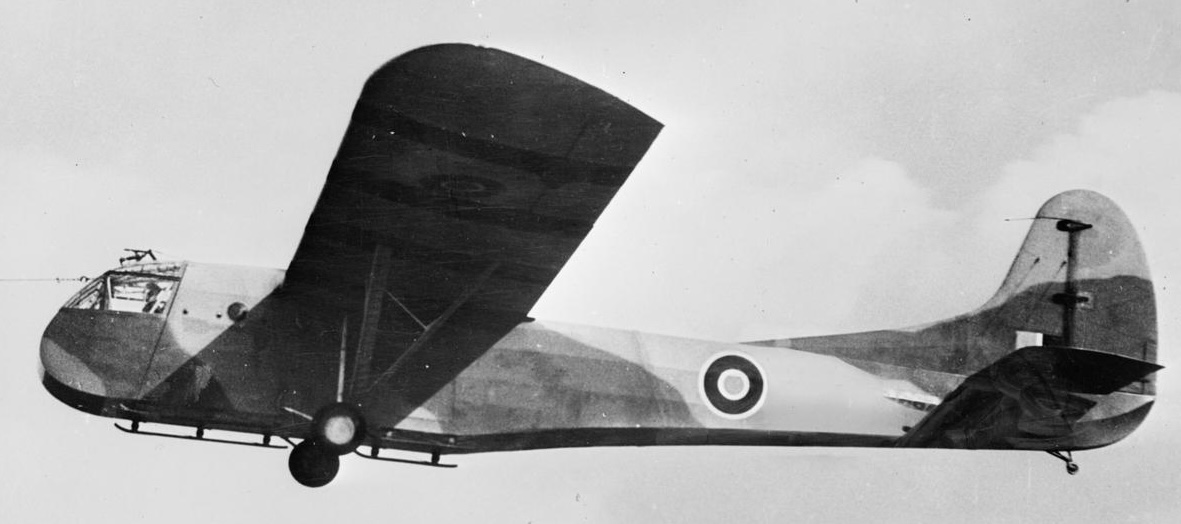
A British Hadrian Glider

A large number of paratroop drop aircraft were also hit and lost. Operation Varsity's paratroop drop phase was flown in daylight at slow speeds at very low altitudes, using unarmed cargo aircraft, over heavy concentrations of German 20 mm, 37 mm, and larger calibre antiaircraft (AA) cannon utilizing explosive, incendiary, and armor-piercing incendiary ammunition. By that stage of the war, German AA crews had trained to a high state of readiness; many batteries had considerable combat experience in firing on and destroying high speed, well-armed fighter and fighter-bomber aircraft while under fire themselves. Finally, while many if not all of the C-47s used in Operation Varsity had been retrofitted with self-sealing fuel tanks, the much larger C-46 Commando aircraft employed in the drop received no such modification. This was exacerbated by the C-46's unvented wings, which allowed leaked gasoline to pool at the wing root where it could be ignited by flak or a stray spark. 19 of 72 C-46 aircraft were destroyed during Operation Varsity, and losses of other aircraft types from AA fire were also significant, including 13 gliders shot down, 14 crashed, and 126 damaged; 15 Consolidated B-24 bombers shot down, and 104 damaged; and 30 C-47s shot down and 339 damaged.

Lieutenant-Colonel Otway, who wrote an official history of the British airborne forces during World War II, stated that Operation Varsity highlighted the vulnerability of glider-borne units. While they arrived in complete sub-units and were able to move off more quickly than airborne troops dropped by parachute, the gliders were easy targets for anti-aircraft fire, and short-range small-arms fire once landed; Otway concluded that in any future operations, troops dropped by parachute should secure landing zones prior to the arrival of glider-borne units. By having the landings conducted during daylight to ensure greater accuracy, the Allied planners incurred a far greater casualty rate, particularly amongst the glider-borne elements. The operation also suffered from poor piloting; although better than in the Sicilian and Normandy operations, there were significant failures on the part of the pilots although the drop was conducted in daylight, without the difficulties of darkness. A significant error occurred when the pilots of the transports carrying 513th Parachute Infantry Regiment dropped much of the regiment several miles from their designated drop zones, with the mis-dropped units actually landing in the British landing zones.

== See also ==
- List of military operations in the West European Theater during World War II by year

== Footnotes ==
=== References and further reading ===
- Allen, Peter (1994) [1980]. The Rhine Crossing of 1945. New York: Barnes & Noble. ISBN 1-56619-747-3.
- Blair, Clay (1985). Ridgway's Paratroopers – The American Airborne in World War II. The Dial Press. ISBN 1-55750-299-4.
- Delaforce, Patrick (2015). Onslaught on Hitler's Rhine: Operations Plunder and Varsity, March 1945. Stroud: Fonthill Media. ISBN 978-1781554418.
- Devlin, Gerard M. (1979). Paratrooper – The Saga Of Parachute And Glider Combat Troops During World War II. Robson Books. ISBN 0-312-59652-9.
- Ellis, Lionel; Warhurst, A. E. (2004) [1968]. Butler, J. R. M. (ed.). Victory in the West: The Defeat of Germany. History of the Second World War United Kingdom Military Series. Vol. II (pbk. facs. repr. Naval & Military Press, Uckfield ed.). London: HMSO. ISBN 1-84574-059-9.
- Fenelon, James M. (2019). Four Hours of Fury. New York: Scribner/Simon & Schuster. ISBN 978-1-5011-7937-2.
- Flanagan, E. M. Jr (2002). Airborne – A Combat History Of American Airborne Forces. Random House. ISBN 0-89141-688-9.
- Fraser, David (1999). And We Shall Shock Them: The British Army in the Second World War. Phoenix. ISBN 0-304-35233-0.
- Gregory, Barry (1974). British Airborne Troops. MacDonald. ISBN 0-385-04247-7.
- Harclerode, Peter (2005). Wings Of War – Airborne Warfare 1918–1945. Weidenfeld & Nicolson. ISBN 0-304-36730-3.
- Hastings, Max (2004). Armageddon – The Battle For Germany 1944–45. Macmillan. ISBN 0-330-49062-1.
- Huston, James A. (1998). Out Of The Blue – U.S Army Airborne Operations In World War II. Purdue University Press. ISBN 1-55753-148-X.
- Jewell, Brian (1985). "Over The Rhine" – The Last Days Of War In Europe. Stroud: Spellmount. ISBN 0-87052-128-4.
- MacDonald, Charles B (1990). The Last Offensive. United States Army in World War II European Theater of Operations. Office of the Chief of Military History, Department of the Army.
- Ministry of Information (1978). By Air To Battle – The Official Account Of The British Airborne Divisions. London: P. Stephens. ISBN 0-85059-310-7.
- Norton, G. G. (1973). The Red Devils – The Story Of The British Airborne Forces. Pan Books. ISBN 0-09-957400-4.
- O'Neill, N. C., ed. (1951). Odhams History of the Second World War. Vol. II. London: Odhams Press. OCLC 819684261.
- Otway, Lieutenant-Colonel T. B. H. (1990). The Second World War 1939–1945 Army – Airborne Forces. London: Imperial War Museum. ISBN 0-901627-57-7.
- Rawson, Andrew (2006). Rhine Crossing: Operation Varsity – 30th and 79th US Divisions and 17th US Airborne Division. Pen & Sword Military. ISBN 1-84415-232-4.
- Rodger, Alexander (2003). Battle Honours of the British Empire and Commonwealth Land Forces. Marlborough: The Crowood Press. ISBN 1-86126-637-5.
- Saunders, Hilary St. George (1972). The Red Beret – The Story Of The Parachute Regiment 1940–1945. White Lion. ISBN 0-85617-823-3.
- Saunders, Tim (2006). Operation Plunder: The British & Canadian Rhine Crossing. Leo Cooper. ISBN 1-84415-221-9.
- Smith, Claude (1992). History of the Glider Pilot Regiment. Pen & Sword Aviation. ISBN 1-84415-626-5.
- Trigg, Jonathan (2020). To VE Day Through German Eyes: The Final Defeat of Nazi Germany. Stroud, Gloucestershire, UK: Amberley Publishing. ISBN 978-1-4456-9944-8.
- Tugwell, Maurice (1971). Airborne To Battle – A History Of Airborne Warfare 1918–1971. William Kimber. ISBN 0-7183-0262-1.
- Warren, Dr. John C. (1956). Airborne Operations in World War II, European Theater (PDF). USAF Historical Studies. Maxwell AFB, AL: USAF Historical Division Research Studies Institute. OCLC 78918574. Archived from the original (PDF) on 24 June 2016.
- Whiting, Charles (1985). Bounce the Rhine: The Greatest Airborne Operation in History. Leo Cooper/Secker & Warburg. ISBN 0436574004.
- Wright, Stephen L. (2008). The Last Drop, Operation Varsity, March 24–25, 1945. Stackpole Books. ISBN 978-0811703109.
- Cooper, Kenneth. "The Reluctant Glider Pilot, a personal account". www.uk-us.org. Archived from the original on 4 January 2009.
- Dunford Wood, CDC (24 March 2015). "Story of War, personal account from a Spitfire pilot tasked with photographing the landings". www.storyofwar.com.
- Hagerman, Bart (12 June 2006). "Operation Varsity: Allied Airborne Assault Over The Rhine". World War II Magazine.
- Murray, Williamson (12 June 2006). "Airborne Operations During World War II". World War II Magazine.
- Pogue, Forrest C. "Chapter XXI – The Battle for the Rhineland". United States Army Center of Military History.
- "Operation Varsity – The Rhine Crossing". Ministry of Defense, British Army/The Parachute Regiment. Archived from the original on 3 August 2006.
- "Crossing the Rhine: Operation Varsity". National WWII Glider Pilots Association, Inc.
