= Isadore S. Jachman =

German-born Medal of Honor recipient

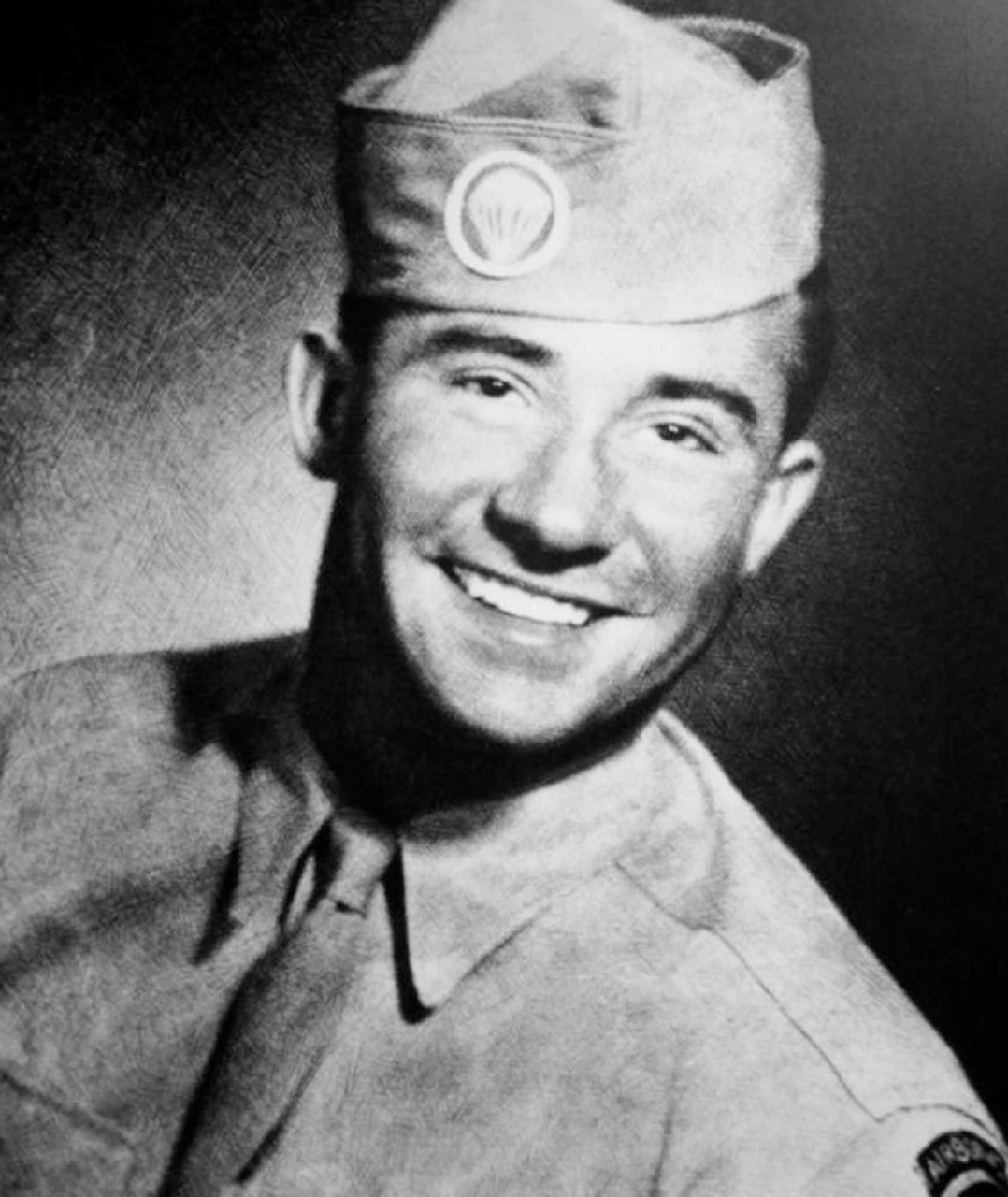
- Born: Isadore Siegfried Jachman; December 14, 1922; Berlin, Germany
- Died: January 4, 1945 (aged 22); Flamierge, Belgium
- Burial place: Adahs Israel Congregation Cemetery, Dundalk, Maryland
- Military career
- Allegiance: United States
- Branch: United States Army
- Years of service: 1942–1945
- Rank: Staff sergeant
- Unit: 513th Parachute Regiment
- Conflict: World War II
- Awards: Medal of Honor

Isadore Siegfried Jachman (December 14, 1922 – January 4, 1945) was a United States Army staff sergeant who was killed in World War II after defending the town of Flamierge in Belgium from a German attack on January 4, 1945, for which he received the Medal of Honor.

== Background ==
Isadore Jachman was born in Berlin, Germany, on December 14, 1922, the first son of Leo and Lotte Jachman. The family moved to the United States when Isadore was two years old. He was raised in Baltimore, Maryland and attended high school at the Baltimore City College, graduating in 1939. Jachman, who was Jewish, had relatives who were murdered in the Holocaust, including six aunts and uncles. He joined the Army in November 1942.

== Medal of Honor action ==
Sergeant Jachman, Company B, 513th Parachute Infantry Regiment and his company were pinned down by enemy artillery, mortar, small arms fire and two hostile tanks that attacked the unit, inflicting heavy casualties. Sergeant Jachman left his place of cover, dashed across open ground, through a hail of fire and grabbed a bazooka from a fallen comrade. He then advanced on the tanks, which concentrated their fire on him. Firing his weapon, he damaged one and forced both of them to retire.

Some years later the village of Flamierge erected a statue where an unknown American soldier had stood fighting to save the village. Later, a search of Army records established that this indeed was Staff Sgt. Jachman, and his name was added to the statue. Today, the Staff Sgt. Isadore Jachman Armory is located at 12100 Greenspring Avenue, Owings Mills, Maryland. His Medal of Honor was awarded to his family in June 1950.

== Medal of Honor citation ==
STAFF SERGEANT ISADORE S. JACHMAN
UNITED STATES ARMY

For conspicuous gallantry and intrepidity above and beyond the call of duty at Flamierge, Belgium, on 4 January 1945, when his company was pinned down by enemy artillery, mortar, and small arms fire, 2 hostile tanks attacked the unit, inflicting heavy. casualties. S/Sergeant. Jachman, seeing the desperate plight of his comrades, left his place of cover and with total disregard for his own safety dashed across open ground through a hail of fire and seizing a bazooka from a fallen comrade advanced on the tanks, which concentrated their fire on him. Firing the weapon alone, he damaged one and forced both to retire. S/Sergeant. Jachman's heroic action, in which he suffered fatal wounds, disrupted the entire enemy attack, reflecting the highest credit upon himself and the parachute infantry.

== Awards and decorations ==

Badge	Combat Infantryman Badge		
1st row	Medal of Honor		
2nd row	Bronze Star Medal	Purple Heart	Army Good Conduct Medal
3rd row	American Campaign Medal	European–African–Middle Eastern Campaign Medal with two campaign stars	World War II Victory Medal
Badge	Parachutists Badge		
Awards	Meritorious Unit Commendation		

== See also ==
- List of Jewish Medal of Honor recipients
- List of Medal of Honor recipients for World War II
