= William M. Miley =

United States Army general (1897–1997)

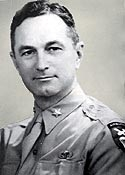
- Born: December 26, 1897; Fort Mason, California, United States
- Died: September 24, 1997 (aged 99); Starkville, Mississippi, United States
- Burial place: Odd Fellows Cemetery, Mississippi, United States
- Military career
- Allegiance: United States
- Branch: United States Army
- Service years: 1918–1955
- Rank: Major General
- Nickname: "Bud"
- Service number: 0-11232
- Unit: Infantry Branch
- Commands: 501st Parachute Infantry Battalion; 503rd Parachute Infantry Regiment; 1st Parachute Infantry Brigade; 17th Airborne Division; 8th Infantry Division; 11th Airborne Division
- Conflicts: World War I World War II
- Awards: Army Distinguished Service Medal (2); Silver Star; Bronze Star (2); Distinguished Service Order (United Kingdom)
- Other work: Professor (Mississippi State University)

William Maynadier Miley (December 26, 1897 – September 24, 1997) was a major general in the United States Army who commanded the 17th Airborne Division during World War II, leading the division through the Battle of the Bulge and Operation Varsity.

== Early life and military career ==
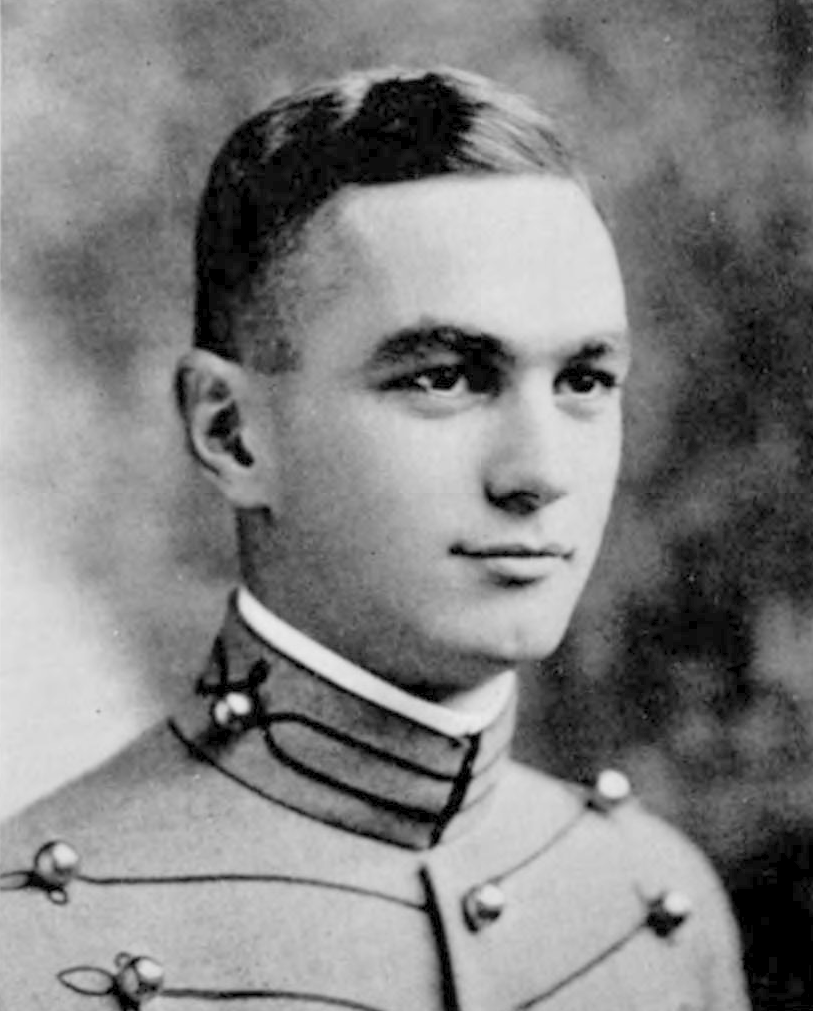
At West Point in 1918

William M. Miley was born at Fort Mason in California, to Sara Miley and Lieutenant Colonel John D. Miley (for whom Fort Miley Military Reservation was named). His family had a long history of military service, with three generations before him serving in the United States Army. Two great-grandfathers, his grandfather, his father, his great-uncle, his uncle and his son all graduated from the United States Military Academy (USMA) at West Point, New York.

Miley himself attended the USMA, where he earned a national intercollegiate championship in gymnastics (in the tumbling, rings, and parallel bars events), and graduated in 1918, the year after the American entry into World War I, whereupon he was commissioned as a second lieutenant into the Infantry Branch of the United States Army. Immediately after graduation he was sent to the Western Front and served with the 1st Division, part of the American Expeditionary Force (AEF) until the end of the war on November 11, 1918.

== Between the wars ==
Following the war, Miley held a series of assignments, including as a professor of military science at what was then Mississippi State College, in Starkville, Mississippi. It was during this time that he met and married his wife, Julia Sudduth. Other assignments included serving as athletic director at West Point, and infantry assignments in Panama, the Philippines, and at Fort Sam Houston.

In 1940, Miley (then holding the rank of major) was ordered to organize and command the United States Army's first paratrooper unit, the 501st Parachute Infantry Battalion.

== World War II ==
After his promotion to lieutenant colonel, shortly after the Japanese attack on Pearl Harbor in December 1941, Miley was ordered to organize and command the 503rd Parachute Infantry Regiment (PIR). Shortly afterwards he was appointed Assistant Division Commander (ADC) of the 82nd Airborne Division at Camp Claiborne, Louisiana, serving under Major General Matthew Ridgway.

In April 1943, Miley organized the activation of the 17th Airborne Division at Camp Mackall, North Carolina. He was the sole commander of the 17th Airborne Division during the war, leading the division through such actions on the Western Front as the Battle of the Bulge and Operation Varsity. The division was deactivated in late 1945, but reactivated briefly in 1948 as a training unit.

== Postwar ==
After the war, Miley was appointed to command the 11th Airborne Division while it occupied Japan, and after its return to Fort Campbell, Kentucky. He had several later assignments, including serving as Director of the Joint Airborne Troop Board, Commander of U.S. Army Alaska, under the Alaskan Command. He also served as Chief of Staff of the former Continental Army Command (which became the United States Army Forces Command in 1973). He retired from the military in 1955, with a rank of major general.

Following his retirement from the army in 1955, Miley worked for Merrill Lynch, Pierce, Fenner & Beane, until his retirement in 1976, at which time he returned to Starkville, Mississippi. Miley was the second to last living division commander of World War II. He died in Starkville in September 1997 at the age of 99, three months short of turning 100. Only Major General Ralph C. Smith, who commanded the 27th Infantry Division during World War II, would live longer, dying in January 1998 at the age of 104.

== Awards and decorations ==
Parachutist Badge

Army Distinguished Service Medal with oak leaf cluster
Silver Star
Bronze Star with oak leaf cluster
Distinguished Service Order (United Kingdom)

A section of Mississippi Highway 389 (where it runs through Starkville) named the Major General William 'Bud' Miley Highway.

Military offices
Preceded by Newly activated organization	Commanding General 17th Airborne Division; 1943–1945	Succeeded by Post deactivated
Preceded by Bryant Moore	Commanding General 8th Infantry Division; October–November 1945	Succeeded by Post deactivated
Preceded by Joseph May Swing	Commanding General 11th Airborne Division; 1946–1949	Succeeded by Ridgely Gaither
