= 513th Parachute Infantry Regiment =

- Drawing of parachutist badge with airborne background trimming of the 513th PIR of WWII
- Active: 1943–1945; 1948–1949
- Country: United States
- Branch: United States Army
- Type: Airborne forces
- Role: Parachute infantry
- Size: Regiment
- Engagements: Battle of the Bulge; Operation Varsity

Commanders
- Notable commanders: James W. Coutts

The 513th Parachute Infantry Regiment (513th PIR) was an airborne infantry regiment of the United States Army, raised during World War II. The 513th formed part of the 17th Airborne Division and participated in the European Campaign, fighting in the latter stages of the Battle of the Bulge in January 1945 and parachuted into Germany in Operation Varsity in March, in the largest airborne drop of the war. The regiment returned to the United States in September 1945 where it was inactivated.

== History ==
Col. James W. Coutts c. 1944

The 513th Parachute Infantry Regiment was constituted on 26 December 1942 in the United States Army, assigned to the 13th Airborne Division, and activated on 11 January 1943 at Fort Benning, Georgia. It then moved to Fort Bragg before being assigned to Camp Mackall, North Carolina, in January 1944, but was transferred to the Tennessee Maneuver Area and, in March 1944, assigned to the 17th Airborne Division, commanded by Major General William "Bud" Miley.

The 513th PIR was not sent overseas until after the D-Day landings, which took place on 6 June 1944, and was still in training in England during Operation Market Garden in September. During the crisis of the Battle of the Bulge in December 1944, the division was flown into Reims, France and moved by truck into southern Belgium. In January 1945, the 513th Parachute Infantry was sent into the assault on Flamierge. During this fight, Staff Sergeant I.S. "Izzy" Jachman raced through heavy fire, picked up a bazooka from a fallen comrade and drove off two tanks, damaging one. His Medal of Honor citation concludes, "S/Sgt. Jachman's heroic action, in which he suffered fatal wounds, disrupted the entire enemy attack, reflecting the highest credit upon himself and the parachute infantry." Another Medal of Honor recipient from the regiment was Private First Class Stuart Stryker.

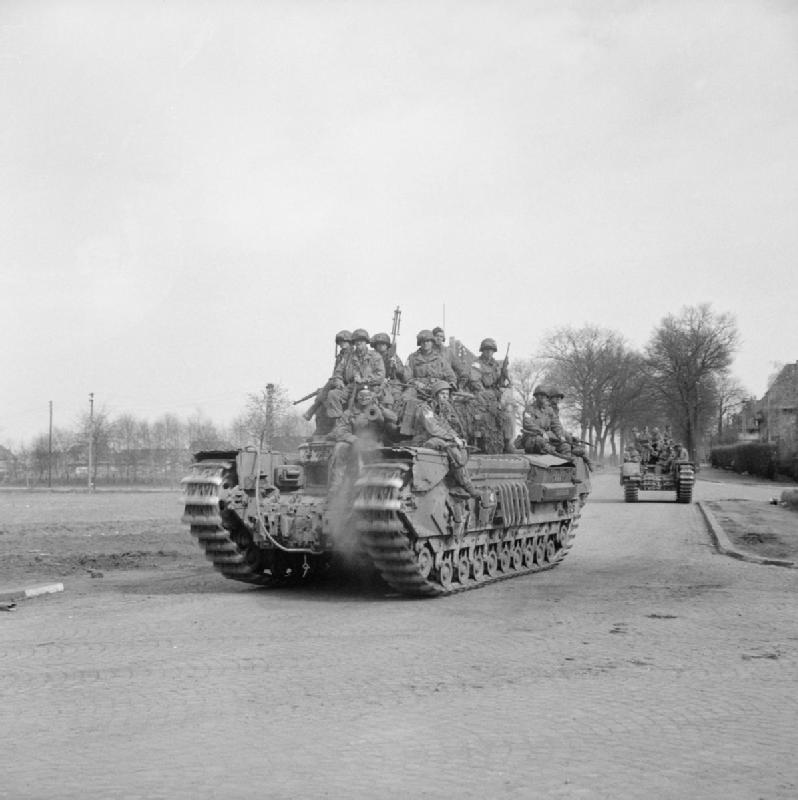
British Churchill tanks of the 6th Guards Tank Brigade carrying American paratroopers of the 513rd Parachute Infantry Regiment through Dorsten, Germany, 29 March 1945.

After the conclusion of the Ardennes campaign, the division was withdrawn in preparation for Operation Varsity. The regiment dropped with the rest of the division into Germany near Wesel in its only combat drop. In April 1945, units of the 513th were carried into action around Munster by British tanks from the Guards Armoured Division.

After conducting occupation duty the 513th Parachute Infantry Regiment returned to the United States on and was inactivated on the same date at Camp Myles Standish, Massachusetts.

On 18 June 1948, it was redesignated the 513th Airborne Infantry Regiment, allotted to the Regular Army, and activated on 6 July 1948 at Camp Pickett, Virginia. It was inactivated from 31 March-10 May 1949 at Camp Pickett.

== Notable members of the 513th ==
- Private First Class Roland L. Bragg, namesake of Fort Bragg since 2025.
- Staff Sergeant Isadore S. Jachman, posthumously awarded the Medal of Honor for actions during the battle for Flamierge, Belgium.
- Private First Class Stuart S. Stryker, posthumously awarded the Medal of Honor for his actions at Wesel, Germany, during Operation Varsity.
- Dallas police officer J. D. Tippit, 513th PIR 1944–1946, shot and killed while trying to apprehend Lee Harvey Oswald after the 1963 assassination of US President John F Kennedy.
- Private Frank Gaylord, sculptor of the National Korean War Veterans Memorial in Washington, DC
