= Lembeck =

Village in North Rhine-Westphalia, Germany

- Village
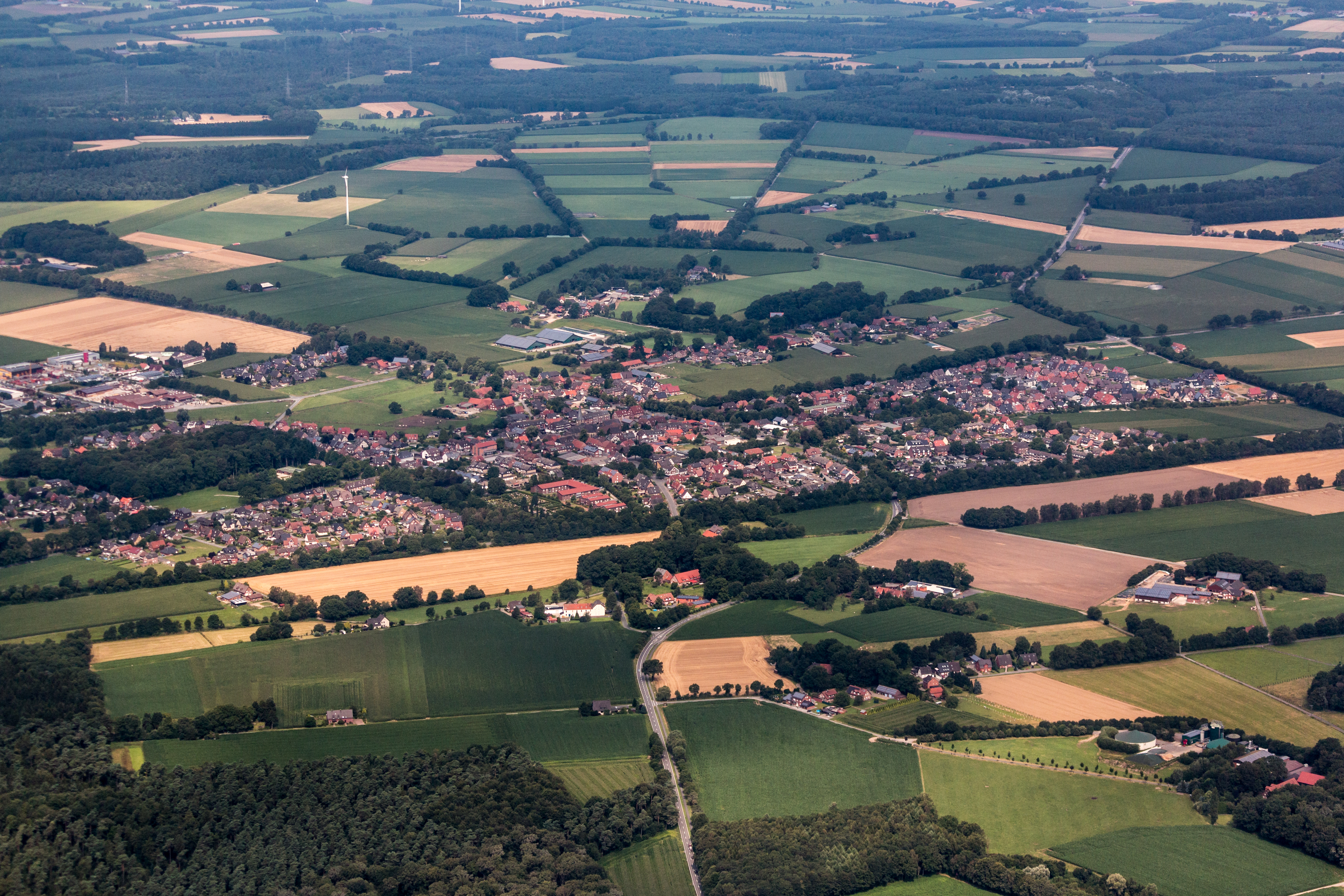
- Aerial view of Lembeck

- Coat of arms

- Location within North Rhine-Westphalia Location within Germany
- Coordinates: 51°45′32″N 06°59′57″E
- Country: Germany
- State: North Rhine-Westphalia
- District: Recklinghausen
- Town: Dorsten
- Incorporation: 1975 January 1

Area
  - Total: 1.99 km^{2} (0.77 sq mi)
- Elevation: 67 m (220 ft)

Population (2020)
  - Total: 5,124
  - Density: 2,570/km^{2} (6,670/sq mi)
- Time zone: UTC+1 (CET)
  - Summer (DST): UTC+2 (CEST)
- Postal code: 46286
- Area code: 02369

Lembeck is a village in the north of Dorsten which belongs to Recklinghausen in Nordrhein-Westfalen, Germany. It is located in the north Ruhr area, on the border with Münsterland. As of the year 2020, it has a total population of 5,124.

== Geography ==
Lembeck is situated to the north of Lippe River, about 12 kilometers north of the city center of Dorsten. Its average elevation is 67 meters above the sea level.

== Transportation ==
Lembeck is connected to the Duisburg–Quakenbrück railway. Lembeck train station is served every hour by the RE 14 Emscher-Münsterland Express between Essen-Steele station and Coesfeld (Westf) station.

== Landmark ==
- Lembeck Castle
