= 326th Infantry Regiment =

326th Regiment 326th Infantry Regiment 326th Glider Infantry Regiment
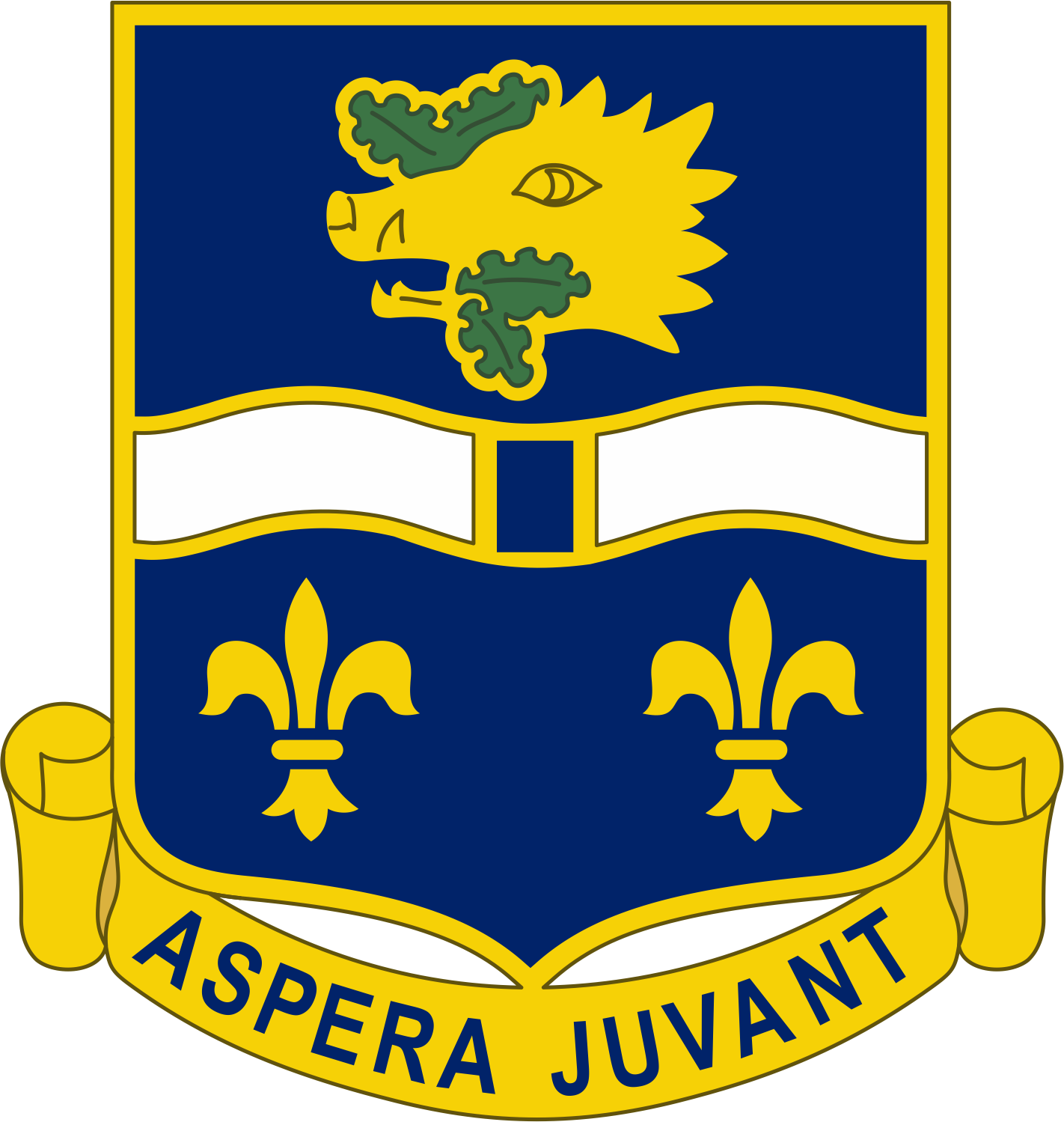
- Distinctive unit insignia of the 326th Glider Infantry Regiment, World War II.
- Active: 1917–1919; 1922–1946
- Country: United States
- Branch: United States Army
- Type: Infantry; Glider infantry
- Size: Regiment
- Garrison/HQ: Alliance Army Airfield
- Mottos: Aspera Juvant, "Difficult Delight"
- Colors: Blue, Gold, and White
- Engagements: World War I World War II

Insignia
- The Glider Badge: Worn by U.S. Army airborne soldiers who rode gliders into combat

The 326th Infantry Regiment was an infantry regiment of the United States Army that saw active service during World War I, as part of the 82nd Division and fought in the Meuse-Argonne Offensive and was inactivated in 1919. The regiment was reactivated during World War II, again as part of the 82nd Infantry Division, and was converted into a glider infantry formation, becoming the 326th Glider Infantry Regiment. Originally part of the 82nd Airborne Division, the regiment transferred to the 13th Airborne Division. However, despite training for almost three years, the 326th was never involved in any combat.

== History ==
=== World War I ===
Under the command of Colonel John Campbell McArthur, a Regular Army officer, the 326th Infantry Regiment was officially activated as one of the four regiments of the 82nd Infantry Division on 29 August 1917, nearly five months after the American entry into World War I, at Camp Gordon, near Atlanta, Georgia. The other regiments of the 82nd Division were the 325th, 327th and 328th Infantry Regiments, together with supporting units. Being part of a National Army division, the 326th was composed of large numbers of conscripts (or "draftees") who had been called up for military service, most of whom had no previous military experience whatsoever. However, the only personnel actually assigned to the regiment were a small cadre of Regular Army soldiers charged with the task of preparing for the thousands of young draftees who would soon be flooding the camp.

The 326th, and its sister unit, the 325th Infantry, both of which were part of the 164th Infantry Brigade, were members of the 82nd Division that was, initially, composed of officers and enlisted men from what most would consider the "Deep South". However, this changed a few weeks into the training program. The War Department issued orders instructing the 82nd Division to send all of its soldiers, minus a 783-man training cadre, to other camps to create new units. Leaders watched as their soldiers departed, to be replaced by draftees from all regions of the United States. It was noted by the division commander, Major General Eben Swift, that the 82nd Division was now made up of soldiers from every state in the union. It is from this fact that the 82nd Division received its nickname of "The All American Division" and is represented by the "Double A" patch worn on members of the 82nd Airborne Division today. The 82nd Division soon began training hard for eventual deployment overseas.

In April 1918, the regiment received orders to move to Camp Upton, New York in preparation for embarkation to France. Their short stay at Camp Upton reflected a growing crisis for the Allied forces on the Western Front. The German Army's Spring Offensive, launched on 21 March 1918, was a desperate attempt to win the war then and there, before the strength of the American Expeditionary Force (AEF) on the Western Front, then consisting of only a few divisions, became overwhelming. The Germans had made gains of over 45 miles (72 km) in France. Other attacks along the Somme, Lys, and Aisne Rivers had stretched the British and French Armies, both, after nearby four years of war, critically short of manpower, to their absolute limits.

Upon their arrival at the French port of Le Havre, on 17 May 1918 the regiment began sending small detachments into the lines to accustom the men to the brutal realities of trench warfare. On 9 June 1918, Captain Jewett Williams of the 326th Infantry was killed in action. He was the regiment's first casualty of World War I.

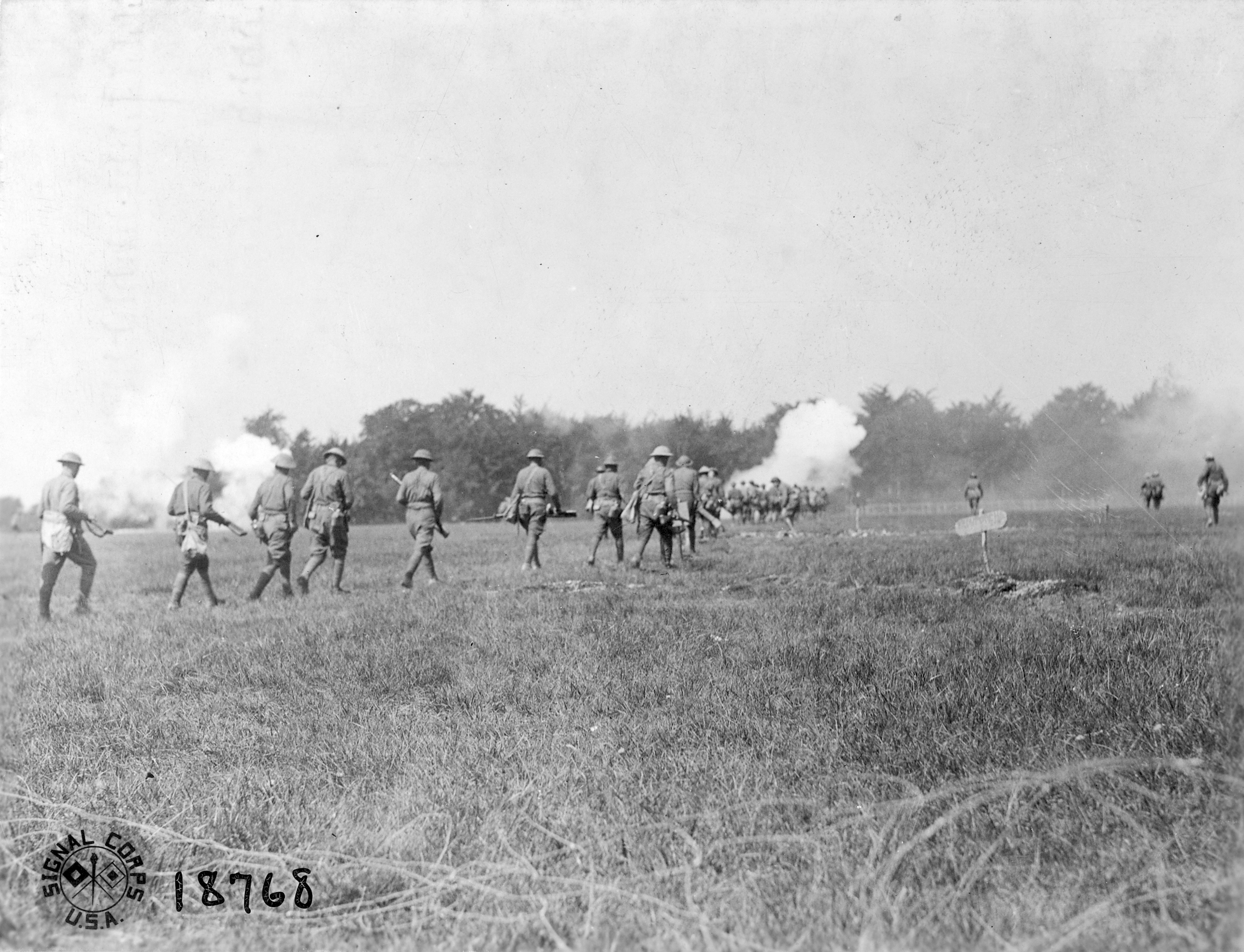
Men of the 326th Infantry Regiment moving towards German trenches at Choloy, France, 25 July 1918

The regiment's first combat assignment was to relieve the 101st Infantry Regiment of the 26th "Yankee" Division in the Toul sector in France where they would enter the line as part of the 82nd Division under the control of the French Seventh Army. On 4 August, the regiment engaged in the 82nd Division's first offensive action of the war. The 326th went "over the top", advancing behind an artillery barrage to capture 3 German machine guns, inflict 73 casualties, and secure the information needed by higher headquarters. Shortly after this action the regiment was relieved and moved to form part of the Marbache defense sector.

The 326th had its first encounter with the deadly mustard gas used by the Germans on 12 September. They endured a night-long barrage of explosive and chemical artillery and persistent strafing by German aircraft. When the sun rose the next morning the soldiers looked out onto a contaminated wasteland. Although the attack on Saint-Mihiel was unsuccessful, the 326th Infantry held its ground and accomplished its mission. The regiment soon received replacements for the casualties sustained and trained in preparation for the next offensive.

The Meuse-Argonne Offensive was the last major offensive of the war, and the largest launched by the AEF on the Western Front during the war. It was, in addition, the largest battle ever fought in the U.S. Army's history, involving well over 1.2 million American soldiers. The offensive was designed to penetrate the German lines and disrupt their logistical base. This was preparatory to further offensive operations involving the actual invasion of Germany. Through ten days of battle, the regiment, sustaining heavy casualties, was able to punch a hole in the German Army's last line of defense. With their removal, the Allied forces had a clear shot at continuing to advance into Germany. The 326th Infantry Regiment, as an integral part of the 82nd Division, shared the distinction of serving in active operations longer, and without relief, than any other regiment in the AEF.

The 326th remained in France, in the Prauthoy area, after the Armistice with Germany was signed on 11 November 1918 at 11:00am. After occupation duties, the regiment returned to the United States in April 1919, and was demobilized at Camp Mills, New York.

=== Interwar period ===
The 326th Infantry Regiment was reconstituted as an Organized Reserve unit on 24 July 1921, assigned to the 82nd Division, and allotted to the IV Corps Area. The regimental headquarters was initiated at Marietta, Georgia, on 14 January 1922, the 1st Battalion at Rome, Georgia, the 2nd Battalion at Augusta, Georgia, and the 3rd Battalion at Atlanta, Georgia. The entire regiment was relocated in 1927 to Atlanta. The personnel of the regiment typically held their Inactive Training Period meetings at the Chamber of Commerce Assembly Hall or the Courtland Street Armory, and conducted summer training most years with the 22nd Infantry Regiment at Camp McClellan, Alabama, Fort McPherson, Georgia, or Fort Oglethorpe, Georgia, or with the 8th Infantry Regiment at Fort Moultrie, South Carolina. As an alternate form on summer training, the regiment supervised infantry Citizens Military Training Camps at Fort Screven, Georgia, Camp McClellan, or Fort Moultrie. The primary ROTC "feeder" schools for new Reserve lieutenants for the regiment were North Georgia College and the University of Georgia.

=== World War II ===
==== Assigned to the 82nd Airborne Division ====
The 326th Infantry Regiment was reactivated under the command of Colonel Stuart Cutler on 25 March 1942, three months after the American entry into World War II, again as part of the 82d Division, then commanded by Major General Omar Bradley. The 326th Infantry Regiment was composed, as it was in World War I, of large numbers of draftees and went through its basic training at Camp Claiborne, Louisiana. A decision was made by General George C. Marshall, the U.S. Army Chief of Staff, that the 82d Division was to be converted into the U.S. Army's first airborne division. As a result of this the 82d Division, now commanded by Major General Matthew Ridgway, was, on 15 August 1942, redesignated as the 82d Airborne Division and the 326th was redesignated as the 326th Glider Infantry Regiment (GIR) and converted into glider infantry, being trained to enter combat by military glider. The 326th GIR, now with only two battalions (the 3d Battalion was sent to help create the 401st Glider Infantry Regiment), with the rest of the 82d Airborne Division, soon moved to Fort Bragg, North Carolina and commenced training in airborne warfare tactics.

In February 1943, the 82d Airborne Division, then composed of the 325th and 326th GIRs and the 504th Parachute Infantry Regiment (PIR), along with supporting airborne units, went through a drastic reorganization. The division was to take part in the Allied invasion of Sicily, codenamed Operation Husky, then scheduled for 10 June 1943, although it was eventually postponed by a month. However, due to a severe shortage of gliders, which were necessary to take both glider regiments into combat, the 82d Airborne Division was reorganized and the 326th, being the junior glider regiment, was transferred out of the 82d and replaced by the 505th PIR. The 326th left Fort Bragg and was sent to train at Alliance, Nebraska, by the Alliance Army Airbase, and soon, alongside the 88th GIR, became part of the 1st Airborne Infantry Brigade .

==== Assigned to the 13th Airborne Division ====
In June 1943 the 326th received a new commander, Colonel William O. Poindexter, who would remain in command of the regiment for the rest of the war. The 326th was later assigned to the 13th Airborne Division, commanded by Major General Elbridge Chapman, when that unit was created in August 1943. Together with the rest of the 13th Airborne Division, which was then composed of the 88th and 326th GIRs and the 515th PIR, along with supporting airborne units, the 326th participated in numerous tough and realistic training exercises throughout the United States. However, training was hampered by a lack of aircraft and the constant need to supply trained replacements for the two airborne divisions then overseas, the 82nd and 101st Airborne Divisions. Training continued until, in October 1944, the division, now brought up to strength, was alerted for service overseas in Western Europe and began preparations for movement.

The 326th moved from Camp Mackall, North Carolina to Camp Shanks, New York, embarking overseas aboard the USS General G. O. Squier. Together with the rest of the division, the regiment, as it did in World War I, landed at Le Havre, France, in February 1945 and moved forward to a staging area. On 1 March 1945 the 326th was reorganized, gaining a third battalion from the deactivation of the 88th GIR. The 13th Airborne Division was originally selected to participate in Operation Varsity, the airborne component of Operation Plunder, codename for the Allied crossing of the Rhine River, alongside two veteran airborne divisions, the British 6th and the U.S. 17th. However, there was not enough transport aircraft available to transport all three divisions and so the 13th Airborne's role in the operation was dropped. Over the next few weeks, numerous other airborne operations were thought of, only to be quickly abandoned, and so the division did not see any combat action, due, as with the division's cancelation from Operation Varsity, to a shortage of transport aircraft. The Allies' rapid advance into Germany after March 1945 denied the need for airborne troops and the 13th Airborne Division was never used, instead being held in reserve by General Dwight D. Eisenhower, the Supreme Allied Commander on the Western Front, for a possible airborne drop into Bavaria.

The end of World War II in Europe arrived on 8 May 1945, now known as Victory in Europe Day (VE-Day). The 13th and 101st Airborne Divisions were scheduled to be sent to the Pacific soon after. However, the Japanese surrendered in late August 1945, almost six years after the war for the European powers had begun, and the 326th, then on its way to the Pacific, returned to the United States, arriving in New York Harbor on 27 August 1945. After the 13th Airborne Division was deactivated, the regiment was again assigned to the 82nd Airborne Division, under Major General James M. Gavin. The 82nd Airborne Division was then stationed at Fort Bragg, North Carolina. The 326th remained there for the next few months until moving to Camp Kilmer, New Jersey, where it was deactivated in February 1946.

== Notable former members ==
- James Ward Morris during World War I

== Photo gallery ==
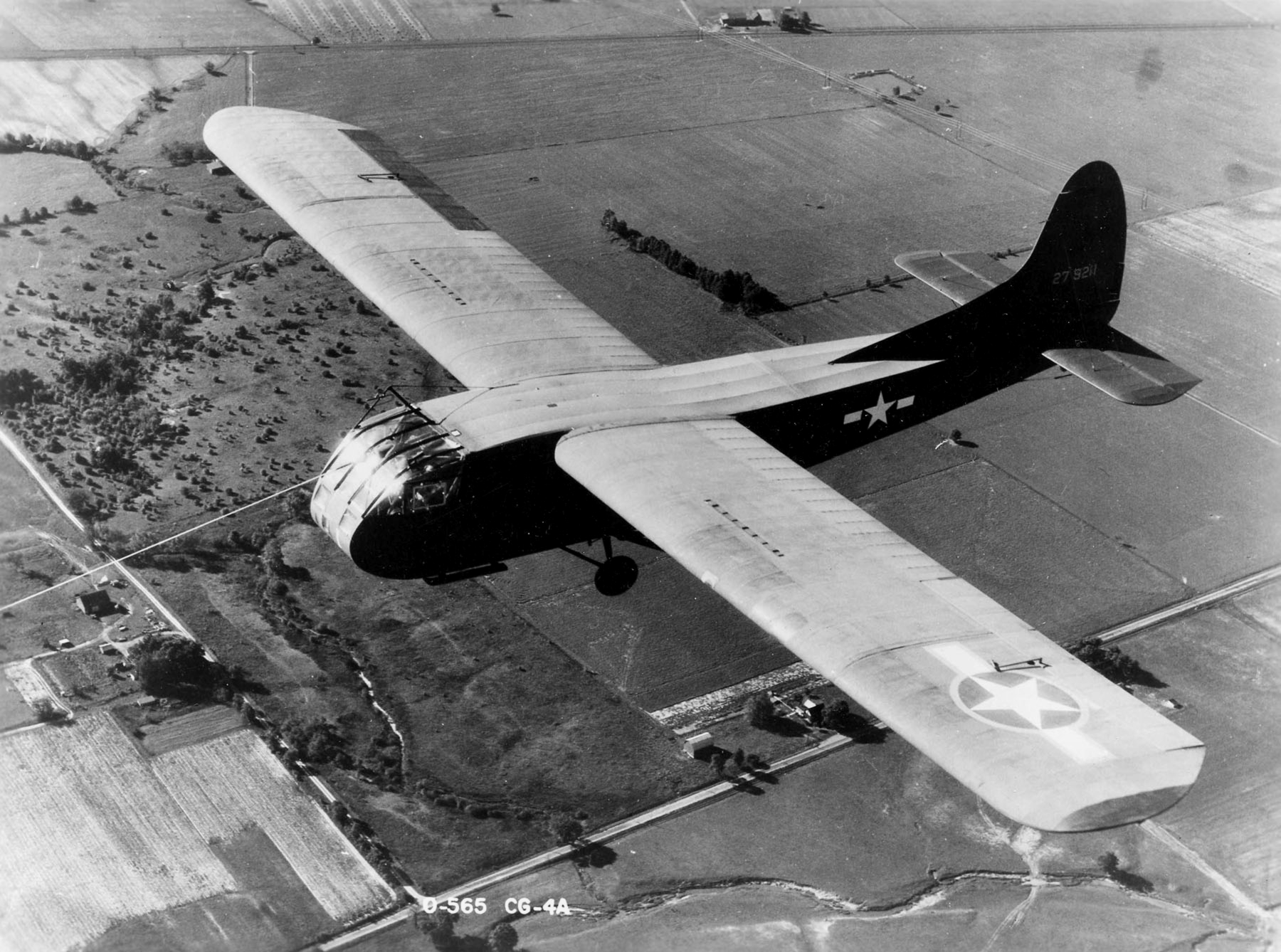
Waco CG-4A in flight

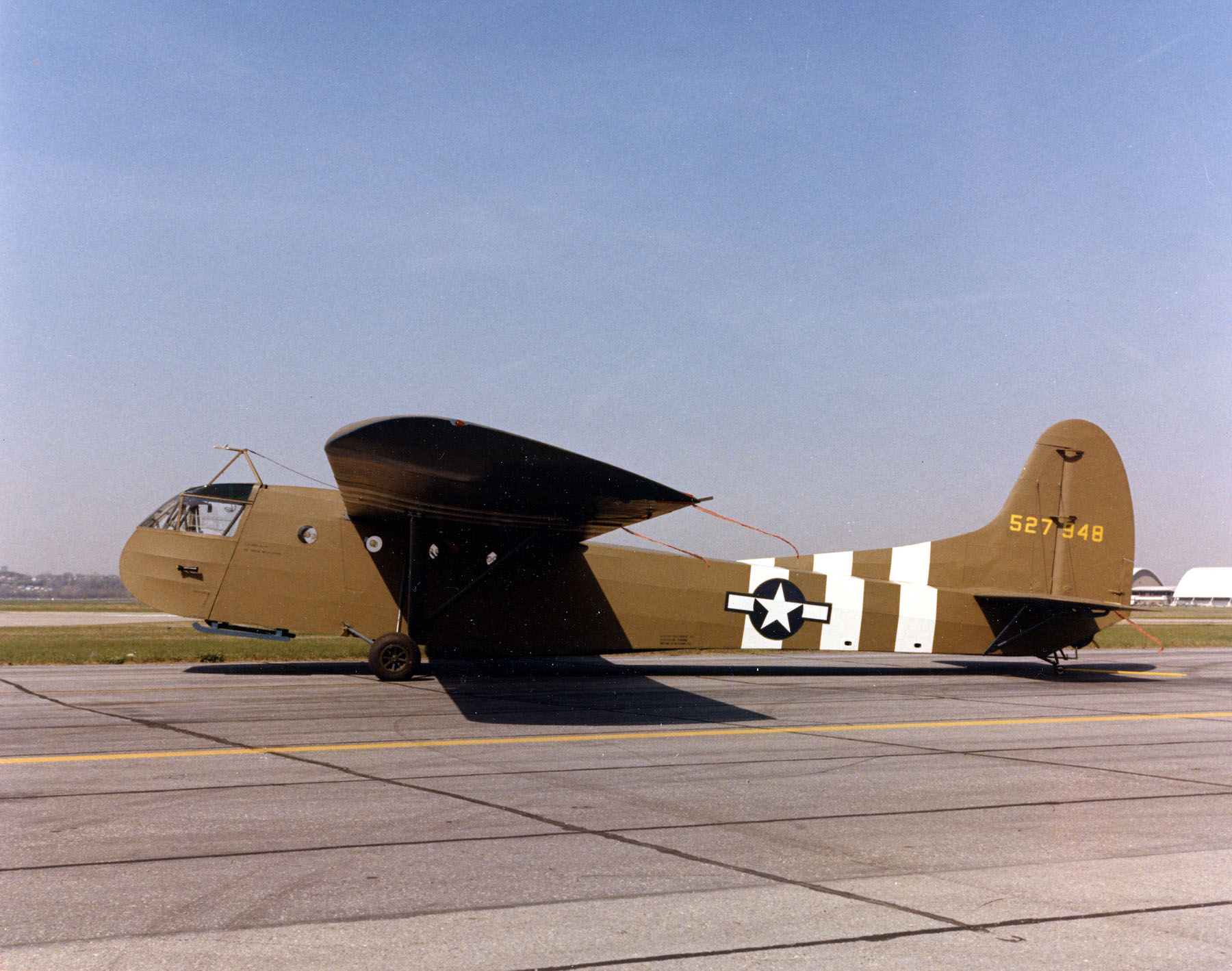
Waco CG-4A on the ground

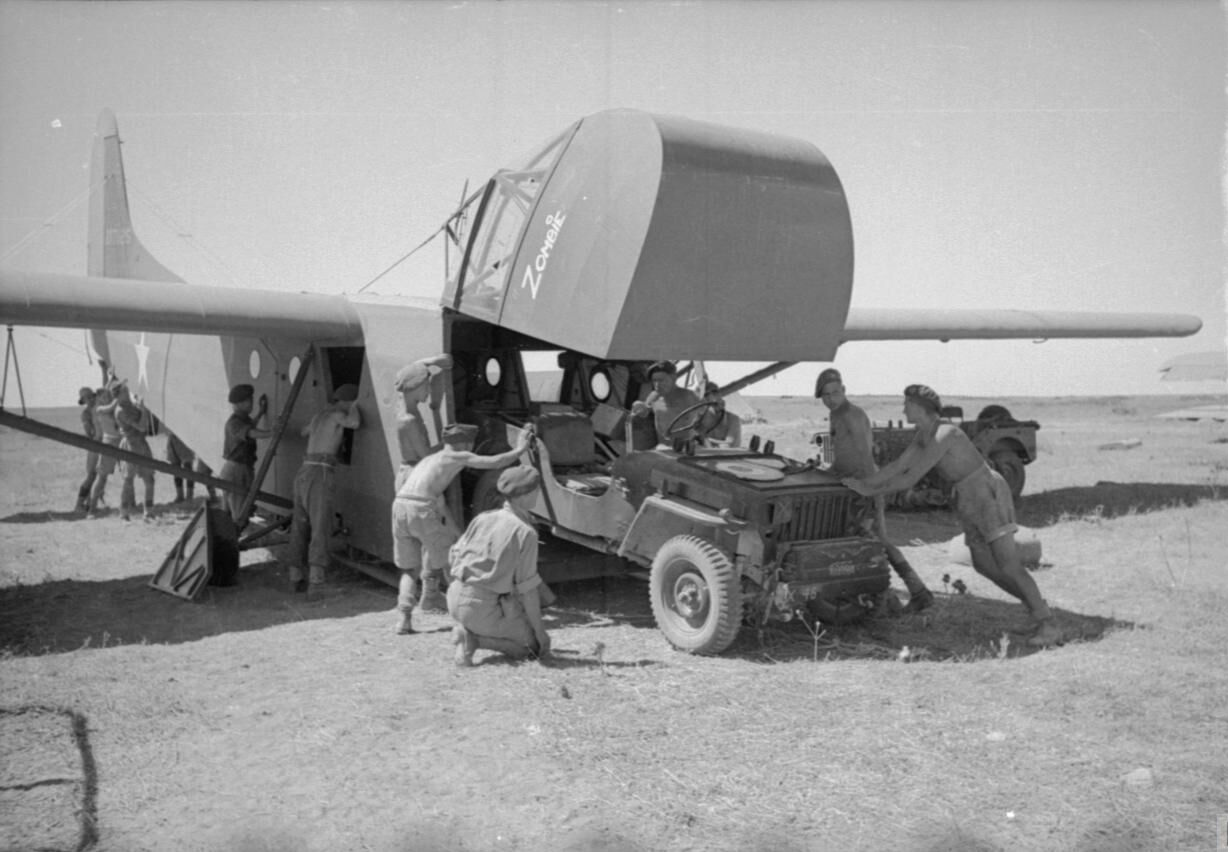
Jeep loading onto Waco glider

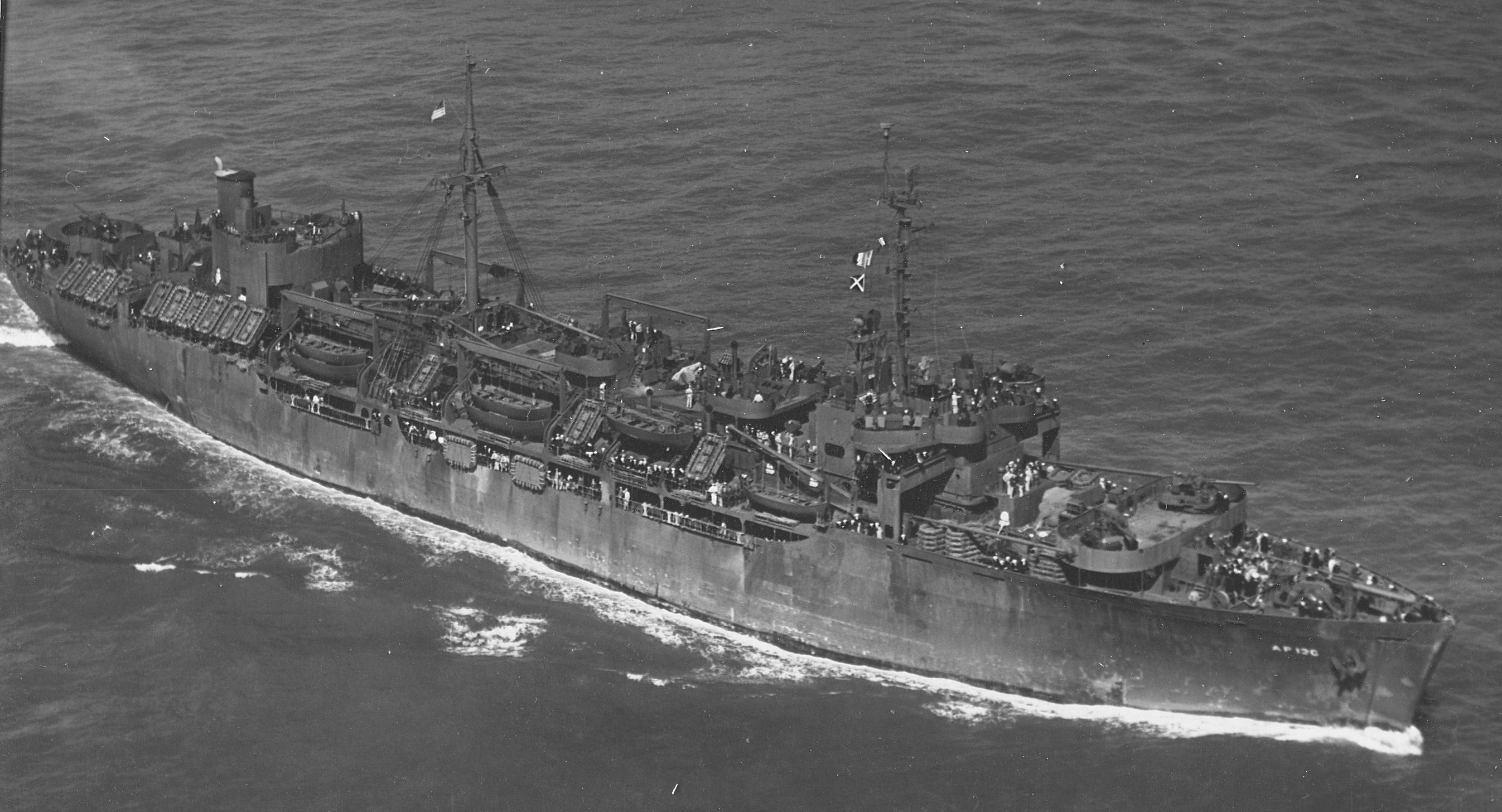
USS General G.O. Squier (AP-130) underway off the coast of California near San Francisco, date unknown
