= Airborne Command (United States) =

United States Airborne Command
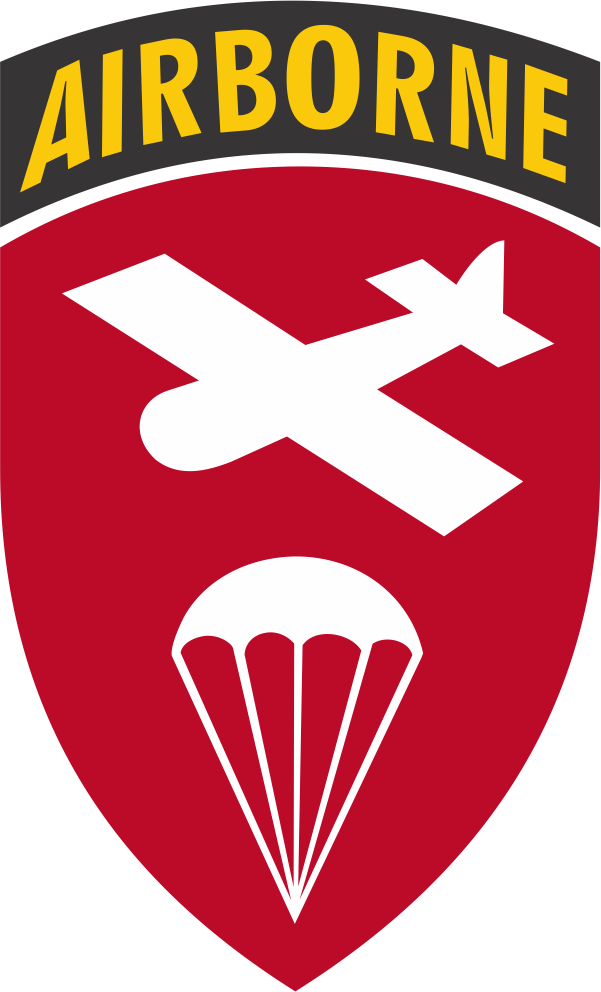
- Active: 1942-1944
- Country: United States
- Branch: United States Army
- Type: Airborne
- Size: Command
- Part of: Army Ground Forces
- Garrison/HQ: Fort Bragg, North Carolina; Camp Mackall, North Carolina

Commanders
- Notable commanders: BG William C. Lee (3/1942–8/1942); BG Elbridge Chapman (8/1942–11/1943); BG Leo Donovan (11/1943–3/1944)

The United States Airborne Command was a unit of the United States Army during World War II. The unit was the idea of William C. Lee and Army Ground Forces commander General Lesly McNair who felt that the newly formed airborne units needed a command to centralize the training, organization and tactics of airborne units. Colonel Lee took command on 21 March 1942, of the newly formed unit.

Airborne Command would take over the following units: 501st Parachute Infantry, 502nd Parachute Infantry, 503rd Parachute Infantry and the 88th Infantry Airborne Battalion. Airborne Command's primary mission was to activate and prepare for combat new airborne units.

The U.S. Army Parachute school at Fort Benning, Georgia, which was also put under control of Airborne Command. Lee supervised the creation or improvement of facilities at Fort Benning and Fort Bragg as well as Pope Field for jump training. Lee was quickly promoted to brigadier general on 19 April and made Lt. Col. Elbridge Chapman his executive officer.

In August 1942, Lee was promoted to Major General and became the commander of the 101st Airborne Division. Colonel Chapman became the commander of Airborne Command and was promoted to Brigadier General. Chapman oversaw the expansion of the command as both the 82nd Airborne and 101st Airborne Divisions were in their final training before leaving for Europe. He oversaw the completion of the Army Air Force glider school and base at Laurinburg-Maxton, North Carolina. Under Chapman's command, glider infantry regiments were trained for glider air insertion at Camp Mackall. In November 1942, Chapman oversaw the activation of the 11th Airborne Division and in December the 17th Airborne Division. In April 1943 Chapman oversaw the movement of HHC Airborne Command to the newly opened Camp Mackall, North Carolina.

In November 1943, Chapman became the Assistant Division Commander of the 13th Airborne Division and Brigadier General Leo Donovan took command.

In March 1944 the command war reorganized and redesignated as the Airborne Center. With the 11th and 17th Airborne Divisions completing their training, the center focused on the 13th Airborne Division. In 1945 the center began to focus on creating three airborne demonstration teams to sell war bonds. The teams were featured in the Sixth and Seventh War Loan Drives.
