= 13th Airborne Division (United States) =

US military unit (1943–1946)

- Shoulder sleeve insignia of the 13th Airborne Division.
- Active: 26 December 1942–25 February 1946
- Country: United States
- Branch: United States Army
- Type: Airborne forces
- Size: Division
- Nickname: "Golden Unicorns"
- Engagements: World War II; Central Europe

Commanders
- Notable commanders: Elbridge G. Chapman

Insignia
- The Parachute Badge: Worn by U.S. Army paratroopers

- The Glider Badge: Worn by U.S. Army airborne soldiers who rode gliders into combat

The 13th Airborne Division was an airborne forces formation of division-size of the United States Army that was active during World War II. The division was commanded for most of its existence by Major General Elbridge G. Chapman. It was officially activated in the United States in August 1943 at Fort Bragg in North Carolina, remaining active until February 1946, however it never saw combat.

After activation, the division remained in the United States to complete its training. This training was completed by September 1944, but had to be extended by a further four months when the division provided replacements for the 82nd and 101st Airborne Divisions. The division also encountered delays in mounting large-scale training exercises due to a lack of transport aircraft in the United States. This shortage was caused by the 82nd and 101st Airborne Divisions taking priority over the 13th in terms of equipment as the two divisions were serving in combat in Europe. As a consequence of these delays, the division was not fully trained and combat-ready until January 1945, and it was transferred to France and the European Theater of Operations in February.

When the division arrived in France, it came under the command of the First Allied Airborne Army, which controlled all Allied airborne formations. The division, along with two others, was selected to participate in Operation Varsity, the airborne operation to support the Anglo-Canadian 21st Army Group crossing the River Rhine, but was removed from the operation as there were insufficient transport aircraft to carry all three divisions into combat. Several other operations were planned for the division after the end of Operation Varsity, but these operations were cancelled when their objectives were achieved by the rapid advance of Allied ground forces and they became superfluous. After the end of the conflict in Europe, the 13th Airborne was shipped to the United States to stage there before it was to participate in the planned invasion of Japan, but the conflict in the Far East ended before it was required and it remained in the United States. The 13th Airborne Division was finally inactivated on 26 February 1946 and its combat personnel were transferred to the command of the 82nd Airborne Division.

== History ==
=== World War II ===
==== Formation ====
The 13th Airborne Division was the fifth airborne division (11th, 13th, 17th, 82nd and 101st) to be formed in the United States during World War II, and was officially activated in the Army of the United States on Friday 13 August 1943 at Fort Bragg in North Carolina under the command of Major General George W. Griner Jr. Only a few months after the activation of the division, however, Major General Griner was ordered to take command of the 98th Infantry Division, and was replaced by Major General Elbridge Chapman, who would go on to command the division for the rest of the conflict. Chapman was one of the early pioneers of the American airborne concept, commanding the experimental 88th Airborne Infantry Battalion in late 1941 when he was a lieutenant colonel, before going on to take command of the 13th Airborne Division. The 88th Airborne Infantry Battalion would be renamed as the 88th Airborne Infantry Regiment, and then finally become the 88th Glider Infantry Regiment on 21 September 1942, forming the core of the 13th Airborne Division. When it was activated, the 13th Airborne Division was initially composed of the 515th Parachute Infantry Regiment, the 88th Glider Infantry Regiment and the 326th Glider Infantry Regiment.

==== Shoulder sleeve insignia ====
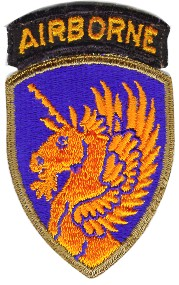
Shoulder patch

The division's shoulder patch, a winged unicorn in orange on an ultramarine blue, the branch of service colors of the United States Army Air Corps, was approved on 2 June 1943. A gold on black "Airborne" tab was worn above the insignia.

The unicorn is associated, by tradition, with qualities of virtue, courage and strength. The horn of the unicorn signifies extreme courage. All of such virtues should be cultivated in all units. It is hoped that these virtues will be conspicuous in the 13th Airborne Division. The unicorn has been winged to represent its travel in the air as "Airborne." The blue background is the color of the Infantry, which is the basic arm of the Division, and also indicates the sky, which is the distinctive medium of travel for the Division.

==== Training ====
Between August 1943 and February 1945, the 13th Airborne Division remained in the United States and did not serve overseas or participate in any airborne operations, as it began training to become a combat-ready formation. In comparison, the 82nd and 101st Airborne Divisions had been assigned as active combat formations to serve overseas in Europe, the 11th Airborne Division was scheduled to be deployed to the Pacific Theater of Operations, and the 17th Airborne Division had been assigned as the United States strategic reserve formation. During this period, the activities of the division primarily involved airborne training as well as taking part in several training exercises. However, while airborne training for the first four American airborne divisions was conducted during 1943, the 13th encountered considerable difficulties when it came to its turn for training. By the last few months of 1943, the 82nd and 101st Airborne Divisions had conducted airborne exercises and finished their training, and had then been transferred to Europe. To ensure these divisions could conduct airborne operations, a majority of the transport aircraft available in the United States had been sent with them, and even more were transferred to Europe as replacements after the American airborne landings in Normandy in June 1944. Consequently, very few transport aircraft were available for use by the 13th, and the original training exercise for the division scheduled for June 1944 had to be postponed to 17 September, and then once again to 24 September.

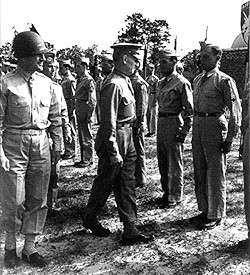
Major General Eldridge G. Chapman and Lieutenant General Lesley J. McNair, commander of Army Ground Forces, inspect troopers of the 13th Airborne Division, 13 May 1944.

The divisional training exercise took place around Camp Mackall, North Carolina, and suffered from a number of difficulties and problems. Poor weather delayed the beginning of the exercise until the night of 25 September, and it was only then the aircraft carrying the first three battalions of paratroopers could take off and attempt to drop the airborne troops on three separate drop zones. A combination of poor visibility and a lack of sufficient training for the pilots of the transport aircraft resulted in the paratroopers being dispersed widely when dropped. Only sixty-five percent of the airborne troops and equipment dropped on the first drop zone were ready for action 90 minutes later, and in the second drop zone the airborne troops were so scattered the commander of the battalion only had control over twenty percent of his men by 10:00 the next morning. A similar number of paratroopers missed the third drop zone, although the majority were dropped in a relatively small area where they could gather. Further problems were encountered, as a plane crash killed eight paratroopers and four aircrew, and the glider-borne elements of the division due to land were delayed by poor weather. After the initial night, the exercise continued for a further three days and included a complex supply mission designed to test whether it was possible to supply an isolated battalion of airborne troops.

Overall, observers present for the exercise reported they were impressed with the performance of the glider-borne elements of the division. However, several noted the training of the aircraft pilots for night formation flying and navigation was far from satisfactory. A recommendation was made for night glider landings to be considered only when an emergency existed, and otherwise gliders should take off during the night and land during daylight to avoid the wide dispersal of airborne troops and a decrease in efficiency. After these exercises had ended, the division continued to train but encountered further delays. These were caused when 1,652 men were removed from the division to provide reinforcements for U.S. Airborne units in the European Theater; this drastically reduced the strength of the division and forced it to extend its training period for a further four months. After completing its training in January, the division was preparing to transfer to the Pacific Theatre in early 1945. However, the rapid advances made by German forces during the Battle of the Bulge led to the division being transferred to the European Theatre of Operations to reinforce Allied divisions already in combat.

==== Combat chronicle ====
The division arrived in the European Theater of Operations in early February, coming under the command of the First Allied Airborne Army, and Major General Chapman was informed there was a possibility the division would be required to conduct airborne operations during the closing stages of the Battle of the Bulge. However, the campaign in the Ardennes ended before the division could be transported there. The next chance for the 13th to participate in an airborne operation and to actually see combat was in March 1945 when the Allies had penetrated into Germany itself and reached the River Rhine. A few weeks before the division was to participate in a combat jump over the Rhine, it was reorganized after a conference by the War Department decided a more efficient composition for an airborne division was two Parachute Infantry Regiments and only a single Glider Infantry Regiment. Subsequently, the 517th Parachute Infantry Regiment, a veteran unit that had served in Italy, Southern France and the Ardennes, joined the division in early March, and the 88th Glider Infantry Regiment was combined into the 326th Glider Infantry Regiment that remained as the division's sole glider-based element. The 517th had recently fought during the Ardennes campaign and received a Presidential Unit Citation for its actions.

Allied disposition in western Europe by March 1945.

The Rhine river was a formidable natural obstacle for the Allied advance, but if it was breached the Allies could access the North German Plain and ultimately to advance on Berlin and other major cities in Northern Germany. Following the 'Broad Front Approach' laid out by General Dwight D. Eisenhower, the Supreme Allied Commander of the Allied Expeditionary Force, it was decided to attempt to breach the Rhine in several areas. Field Marshal Bernard Montgomery, commanding the Anglo-Canadian 21st Army Group, devised a plan to allow the forces under his command to breach the Rhine which he titled Operation Plunder, and which was subsequently authorized by Eisenhower. Plunder envisioned the British Second Army under Lieutenant-General Miles C. Dempsey and the U.S. Ninth Army under Lieutenant General William Simpson crossing the Rhine at Rees, Wesel, and an area south of the Lippe Canal. To ensure the operation was a success, Montgomery insisted an airborne component was inserted into the plans for the operation to support the amphibious assaults that would take place, which was code-named Operation Varsity. Three airborne divisions were initially chosen to take part in Varsity, these being the British 6th Airborne Division, the U.S. 17th Airborne Division, and the 13th, all of which were assigned to U.S. XVIII Airborne Corps commanded by Major General Matthew Ridgway. However, it was discovered there were only enough transport aircraft available in Europe to transport two airborne divisions into combat, and as such the division was removed from Operation Varsity due to its lack of combat experience.

After its removal from Operation Varsity, the division remained in reserve as the Allied armies advanced even further into Germany, moving to Oise, France, on 3 April for supply and administrative tasks. The division was scheduled to participate in several other airborne operations; however, these were all cancelled before they could take place. The first of these was Operation Arena, which envisioned landing between six and ten divisions into what was termed a 'strategic airhead' in the Kassel region of Northern Germany. The planners of the operation envisioned the operation would deny a large swathe of territory to the German defenders and give the Allied armies a staging area for further advances into Germany. The 13th was chosen to participate along with the 17th, 82nd and 101st Airborne Divisions and the British 6th and 1st Airborne Divisions. A preliminary date for 1 May was set for the operation once all of the required airborne and air-landed infantry divisions had been located and supplied, but it was ultimately cancelled on 26 March due to the rapid movement of Allied ground forces negating the need for the operation.

Two other airborne operations were planned to include the 13th. Operation Choker II was to be an airborne landing on the east bank of the Rhine near Worms, Germany; planning for the operation got to an advanced stage, and the division was only hours from taking off from airfields in France when the operation was cancelled due to Allied ground forces overrunning the proposed landing areas. Operation Effective was designed to land the 13th south of Stuttgart, seize a nearby airfield and create an airhead for further forces to land near the Black Forest. The operation was scheduled for 22 April, but was cancelled on 18 April as Allied units encircled the Black Forest region and made the operation unnecessary.

==== Division organization ====
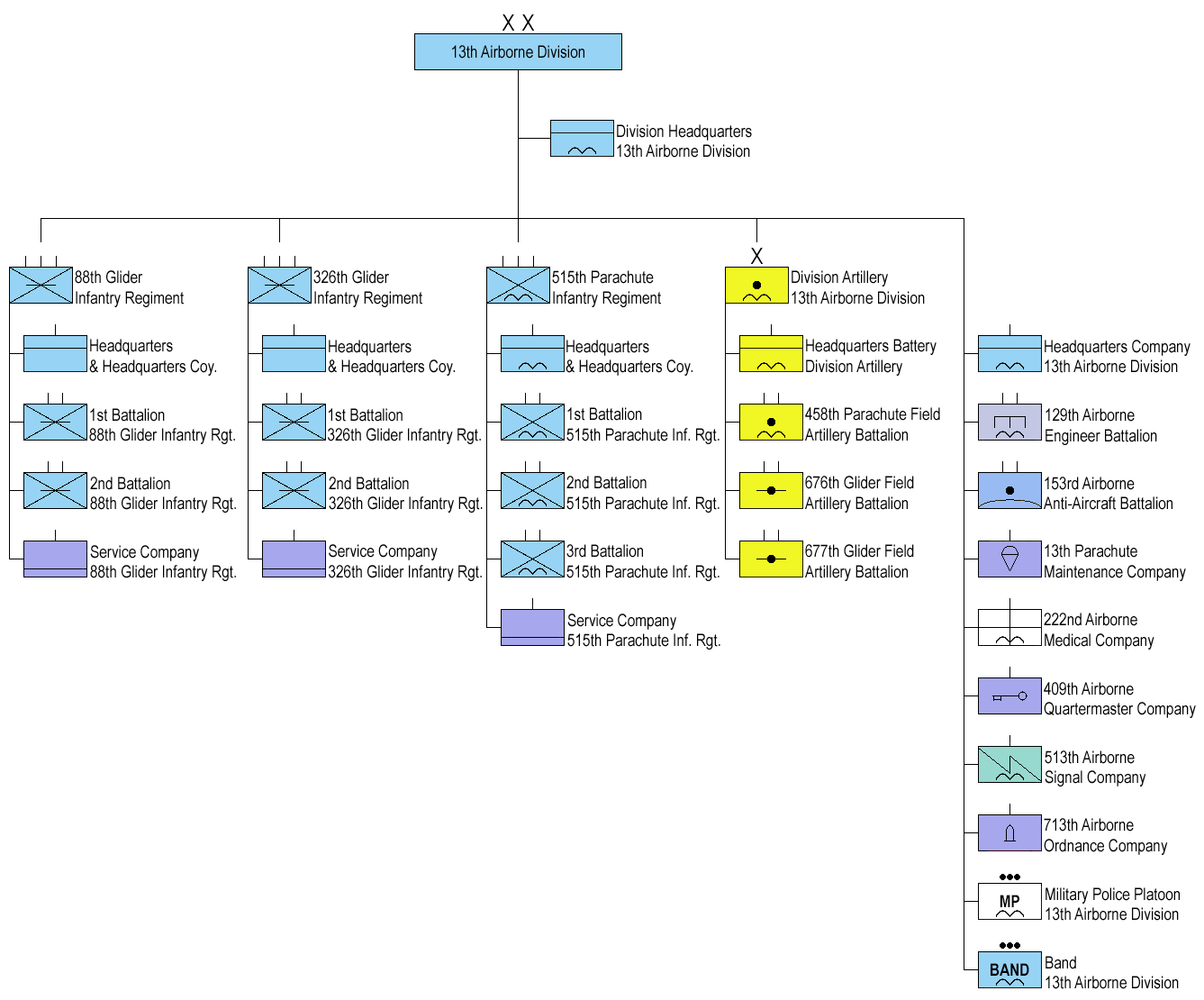
13th Airborne Division organization before 1 March 1945 (click to enlarge)

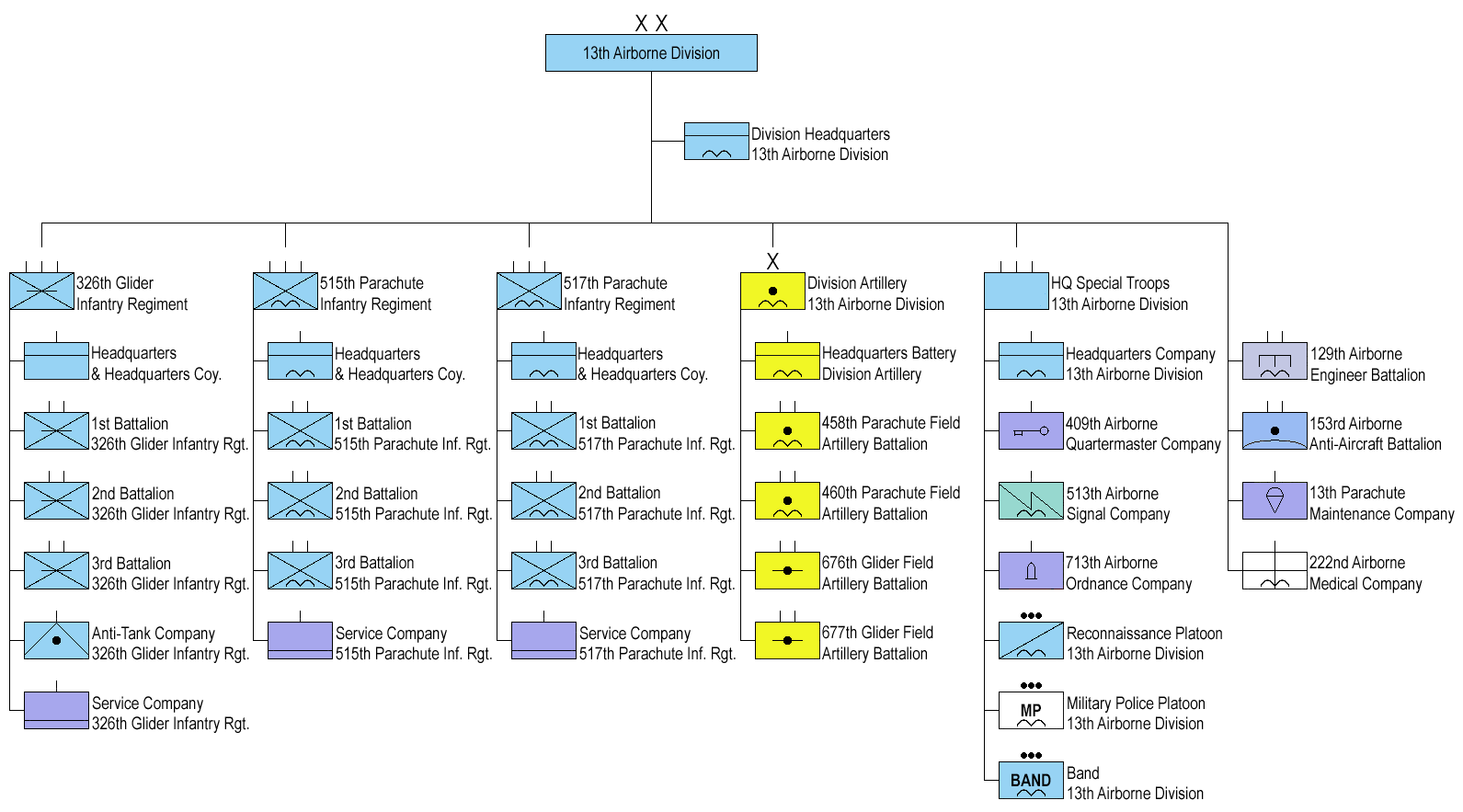
13th Airborne Division organization after 1 March 1945 (click to enlarge)

The 13th Airborne Division was composed of the following units:

- 13th Airborne Division
  - Division Headquarters
  - 88th Glider Infantry Regiment (88th GIR) (disbanded 1 March 1945; assets merged into 326th GIR)
    - Headquarters and Headquarters Company
    - 2× glider infantry battalions
      - each battalion consists of: 1× Headquarters and Headquarters Company, 3× Rifle companies
    - Service Company
  - 326th Glider Infantry Regiment (326th GIR)
    - Headquarters and Headquarters Company
    - 2× glider infantry battalions (3× glider infantry battalions from 1 March 1945)
      - each battalion consists of: 1× Headquarters and Headquarters Company, 3× Rifle companies
    - Anti-Tank Company (assigned 1 March 1945)
    - Service Company
  - 515th Parachute Infantry Regiment (515th PIR)
    - Headquarters and Headquarters Company
    - 3× parachute infantry battalions
      - each battalion consists of: 1× Headquarters and Headquarters Company, 3× Rifle companies
    - Service Company
  - 517th Parachute Infantry Regiment (517th PIR) (assigned 1 March 1945)
    - same organization as 515th Parachute Infantry Regiment
  - 13th Airborne Division Artillery
    - Headquarters Battery
    - 458th Parachute Field Artillery Battalion
      - Headquarters and Headquarters and Service Battery
      - 3× Batteries (M1 75mm pack howitzers)
      - Anti-Aircraft and Anti-Tank Battery (M2 .50-caliber machine guns, M3 37mm Anti-Tank guns, and M1 Bazookas)
    - 460th Parachute Field Artillery Battalion (assigned 1 March 1945)
      - same organization as 458th Parachute Field Artillery Battalion
    - 676th Glider Field Artillery Battalion
      - Headquarters and Headquarters and Service Battery
      - 2× Batteries (M1 75mm pack howitzers)
    - 677th Glider Field Artillery Battalion
      - same organization as 676th Glider Field Artillery Battalion
  - Special Troops (Headquarters activated 1 March 45, until then the units below were directly under the Division Headquarters)
    - Headquarters Company, 13th Airborne Division
    - 409th Airborne Quartermaster Company
    - 513th Airborne Signal Company
    - 713th Airborne Ordnance Company
    - Reconnaissance Platoon (assigned 1 March 45)
    - Military Police Platoon
    - Band
  - 129th Airborne Engineer Battalion
    - Headquarters and Headquarters and Service Company
    - 2× Glider engineer companies
    - 1× Parachute engineer company
  - 153rd Airborne Anti-Aircraft Artillery Battalion
    - Headquarters and Headquarters Detachment
    - 3× Automatic weapon batteries (M3 37mm Anti-Tank guns and from June 1944 M1 57mm anti-tank guns)
    - 3× Machine gun batteries (M2 .50-caliber machine guns)
  - 13th Parachute Maintenance Company
  - 222nd Airborne Medical Company

==== Awards ====
During World War II, members of the division received the following awards:

- Medal of Honor: 1
  - Private First Class Melvin E. Biddle, awarded for actions before the 517th Parachute Infantry Regiment joined the 13th Airborne Division
- Distinguished Service Cross: 6
  - All awarded to members of the 517th Parachute Infantry Regiment
- Legion of Merit: 6
- Bronze Star Medal: 50

Sgt. Harold Russell, who lost both hands in an accident caused by a defective detonator while serving as a training instructor with the division at Camp Mackall, won two Oscars at the 1947 Academy Awards for the film The Best Years of Our Lives - Best Supporting Actor and an honorary Oscar for bringing aid and comfort to disabled veterans through the medium of motion pictures. He played a veteran double amputee trying to readjust to civilian life.

==== Inactivation ====
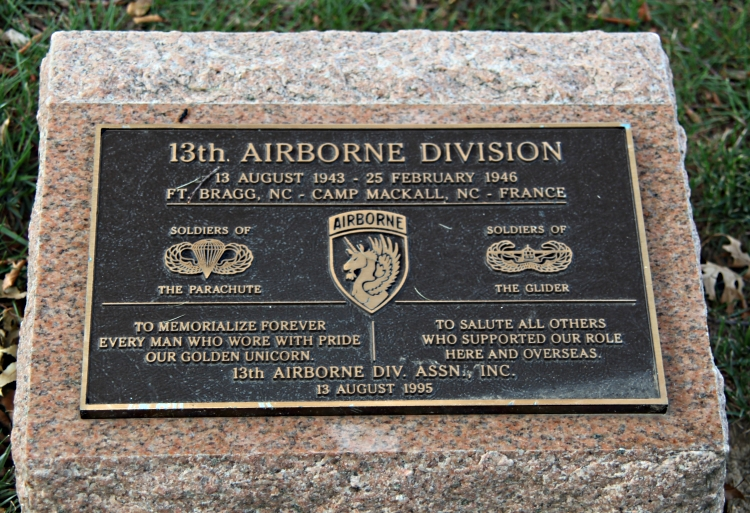
13th Airborne Division memorial, Arlington National Cemetery

The conflict with Germany came to an end a few weeks after Operation Effective was cancelled, and shortly afterwards it was announced the division would be redeployed to the Pacific to participate in the invasion of Japan after a brief stop-over in the United States. The deactivation of the 17th Airborne Division meant the 13th acquired several combat units from the division to bolster it for the envisioned action in Japan. The division arrived in New York City on 23 August, but did not leave the United States before the surrender of Japan in September 1945. With the conflict at an end, the division was no longer required by the United States Army, and it was permanently inactivated at Fort Bragg, North Carolina, on 25 February 1946, with its personnel transferred to the command of the 82nd Airborne Division.

== See also ==
- Precursor 13th Infantry Division unit from World War I

== Bibliography ==
- Blair, Clay (1985). Ridgway's Paratroopers: The American Airborne in World War II. The Dial Press. ISBN 1-55750-299-4.
- Blythe, William J.; Henry, Charles W. (1989). Shoulder Patch of the 13th Airborne Division. Turner Publishing Company. ISBN 0-938021-43-5.
- Devlin, Gerard M. (1979). Paratrooper: The Saga of Parachute and Glider Combat Troops During World War II. Robson Books. ISBN 0-312-59652-9.
- Flanagan, Edward M. Jr (2002). Airborne: A Combat History of American Airborne Forces. The Random House Publishing Group. ISBN 0-89141-688-9.
- Harclerode, Peter (2005). Wings of War: Airborne Warfare 1918–1945. Weidenfeld & Nicolson. ISBN 0-304-36730-3.
- Huston, James A. (1998). Out of the Blue: US Army Airborne Operations in World War II. Purdue University Press. ISBN 1-55753-148-X.
- Jewell, Brian (1985). "Over the Rhine": The Last Days of War in Europe. Spellmount. ISBN 0-87052-128-4.
- Ruppenthal, Rolland G. (1959). United States Army in World War II: The European Theater of Operations: Logistical Support of the Armies, Volume II: September 1944 – May 1945. Center of Military History, United States Army.
- Saunders, Tim (2006). Operation Plunder: The British & Canadian Rhine Crossing. Leo Cooper. ISBN 1-84415-221-9.
- Warren, Dr John C. (1956). Airborne Operations in World War II, European Theater. Air University, Maxwell AFB: US Air Force Historical Research Agency. S2CID 107841708. USAF Historical Study 97.
