= Spottswood William Robinson III =

American judge (1916–1998)

Spottswood Robinson
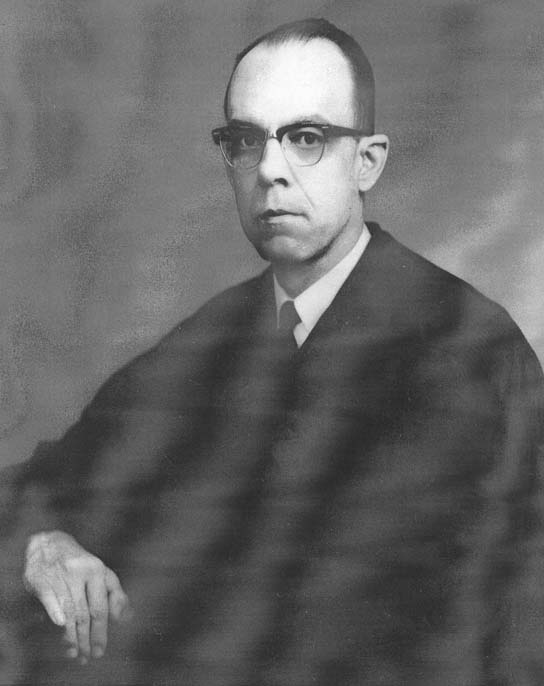

Senior Judge of the United States Court of Appeals for the District of Columbia Circuit
- In office September 1, 1989 – October 11, 1998

Chief Judge of the United States Court of Appeals for the District of Columbia Circuit
- In office May 7, 1981 – July 26, 1986
- Preceded by: Carl E. McGowan
- Succeeded by: Patricia Wald

Judge of the United States Court of Appeals for the District of Columbia Circuit
- In office November 3, 1966 – September 1, 1989
- Appointed by: Lyndon B. Johnson
- Preceded by: George Thomas Washington
- Succeeded by: A. Raymond Randolph

Judge of the United States District Court for the District of Columbia
- In office January 6, 1964 – November 8, 1966
- Appointed by: Lyndon B. Johnson
- Preceded by: James Ward Morris
- Succeeded by: Gerhard Gesell

Personal details
- Born: Spottswood William Robinson III; July 26, 1916 Richmond, Virginia, U.S.
- Died: October 11, 1998 (aged 82) Richmond, Virginia, U.S.
- Education: Virginia Union University (BA); Howard University (LLB)

Spottswood William Robinson III (July 26, 1916 – October 11, 1998) was an American civil rights lawyer, jurist, and educator who served as a United States circuit judge of the United States Court of Appeals for the District of Columbia Circuit from 1966 to 1989. He previously served as a U.S. district judge of the United States District Court for the District of Columbia from 1964 to 1966.

== Education and career ==
Born in Richmond, Virginia, the son of Spottswood William Robinson II (1893-1954), a lawyer, and Inez Irene Clements (1893-1994), a homemaker, Robinson earned an undergraduate degree from Virginia Union University and a Bachelor of Laws from Howard University School of Law in 1939, graduating first in his class and achieving the highest scholastic average in the history of the law school. He was a member of the faculty of Howard University School of Law from 1939 to 1948. He was in private practice of law in Richmond from 1943 to 1960. He was counsel and representative for the Virginia NAACP Legal Defense and Educational Fund from 1948 to 1950. He was southeast regional counsel for the NAACP from 1951 to 1960. He was Professor and Dean of Howard University School of Law from 1960 to 1963. He was a member of the United States Commission on Civil Rights from 1961 to 1963.

=== NAACP LDF cases ===
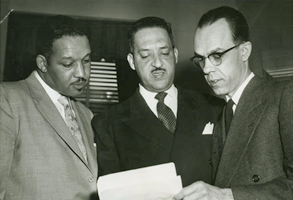
Harold Boulware, Thurgood Marshall, and Spottswood Robinson III in 1953 conferring during Brown case

In the early 1950s, Robinson and his law-partner Oliver Hill, working through the NAACP Legal Defense Fund, litigated several civil rights lawsuits in Virginia. In 1951, Robinson and Hill took up the cause of the African-American students at the segregated R.R. Moton High School in Farmville, Virginia who had walked out of their dilapidated school. The subsequent lawsuit, Davis v. County School Board of Prince Edward County, was consolidated with four other cases decided under Brown v. Board of Education by the Supreme Court of the United States in 1954. In his arguments before the Court, Robinson made the first argument on behalf of the plaintiffs. Robinson also participated in Chance v. Lambeth, which invalidated carrier-enforced racial segregation in interstate transportation.

== Federal judicial service ==
Robinson received a recess appointment from President Lyndon B. Johnson on January 6, 1964, to a seat on the United States District Court for the District of Columbia vacated by Judge James Ward Morris. He was nominated to the same seat by President Johnson on February 3, 1964. He was confirmed by the United States Senate on July 1, 1964, and received his commission on July 2, 1964, becoming the first African-American to serve on this court. His service was terminated on November 8, 1966, due to elevation to the D.C. Circuit.

Robinson was nominated by President Johnson on October 6, 1966, to a seat on the United States Court of Appeals for the District of Columbia Circuit vacated by Judge George Thomas Washington. He was confirmed by the Senate on October 20, 1966, and received his commission on November 3, 1966. He served as Chief Judge from May 7, 1981 to July 26, 1986, becoming the first African-American to both serve on this court and serve as Chief Judge of the court. He assumed senior status on September 1, 1989. His service was terminated on October 11, 1998, due to his death in Richmond.

=== Notable cases ===
Robinson's opinion in Canterbury v. Spence is credited with requiring medical doctors to secure informed consent and as the beginning of a more litigious medical culture.

Judge Robinson presided over the landmark case Laffey v. Northwest Airlines Inc. in the United States Court of Appeals for the District of Columbia Circuit, delivering the opinion for the court in this pivotal case which addressed several discriminatory practices by Northwest Airlines against female flight attendants dealing with unequal pay between male pursers and female stewardesses, discriminatory hiring practices for purser positions, and inequitable treatment in seniority calculations. This ruling was crucial in advancing gender equality in the airline industry. It challenged long-standing discriminatory practices and set important precedents for future cases involving workplace discrimination based on sex.

== See also ==
- List of African-American federal judges
- List of African-American jurists

Legal offices
Preceded by James Ward Morris	Judge of the United States District Court for the District of Columbia; 1964–1966	Succeeded by Gerhard Gesell
Preceded by George Thomas Washington	Judge of the United States Court of Appeals for the District of Columbia Circuit; 1966–1989	Succeeded by A. Raymond Randolph
Preceded by Carl E. McGowan	Chief Judge of the United States Court of Appeals for the District of Columbia Circuit; 1981–1986	Succeeded by Patricia Wald
