= James Ward Morris =

American judge

James Ward Morris Jr.

Judge of the United States District Court for the District of Columbia
- In office June 19, 1939 – November 15, 1960
- Appointed by: Franklin D. Roosevelt
- Preceded by: Seat established by 52 Stat. 584
- Succeeded by: Spottswood William Robinson III

Personal details
- Born: James Ward Morris; November 14, 1890 Smithfield, North Carolina
- Died: November 15, 1960 (aged 70)
- Education: University of North Carolina at Chapel Hill (A.B.); University of North Carolina School of Law read law

James Ward Morris Jr. (November 14, 1890 – November 15, 1960) was a United States district judge of the United States District Court for the District of Columbia.

== Education and career ==
Born in Smithfield, North Carolina, Morris received an Artium Baccalaureus degree from the University of North Carolina at Chapel Hill in 1912. He attended the University of North Carolina School of Law, but read law to enter the bar in 1913. He was in private practice in Tampa, Florida from 1913 to 1933.

He was in the United States Army from 1917 to 1919. He began officer training school at Fort McPherson, Georgia on May 12, 1917 and became a first lieutenant on August 15. He was subsequently assigned to Company C, 326th Infantry Regiment at Camp Gordon. In three months, he was assigned as adjutant of first battalion and became judge advocate. In May 1918, he deployed to France with his Battalion for World War I. In June, he was promoted to captain and assigned to the regimental staff of Colonel John C. McArthur.

He was in the United States Department of Justice from 1933 to 1939, as a special assistant to the Attorney General of the United States from 1933 to 1935, and as an Assistant Attorney General from 1935 to 1939.

== Federal judicial service ==
Morris was nominated by President Franklin D. Roosevelt on May 23, 1939, to a new Associate Justice seat on the District Court of the United States for the District of Columbia (Judge of the United States District Court for the District of Columbia from June 25, 1948) created by 52 Stat. 584. He was confirmed by the United States Senate on June 15, 1939, and received his commission on June 19, 1939. His service terminated on November 15, 1960, due to his death.

He is buried at Myrtle Hill Memorial Park in Tampa, Florida.

== Sources ==
Legal offices
Preceded by Seat established by 52 Stat. 584	Judge of the United States District Court for the District of Columbia; 1939–1960	Succeeded by Spottswood William Robinson III
