= William C. Lee =

US Army general

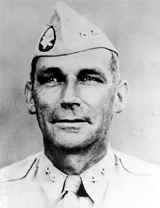
- Born: March 12, 1895; Dunn, North Carolina, United States
- Died: June 25, 1948 (aged 53); Dunn, North Carolina, United States
- Military career
- Allegiance: United States
- Branch: United States Army
- Service years: 1917–1944
- Rank: Major General
- Nickname: "Father of the U.S. Army Airborne"
- Service number: 0-8381
- Unit: Infantry Branch
- Commands: Provisional Parachute Group; Airborne Command; 101st Airborne Division
- Conflicts: World War I World War II
- Awards: Army Distinguished Service Medal; Parachutist Badge; Army of Occupation of Germany Medal; World War I Victory Medal; World War II Victory Medal

Major General William Carey Lee (March 12, 1895 – June 25, 1948) was a senior United States Army officer who fought in World War I and World War II, during which he commanded the 101st Airborne Division, nicknamed the "Screaming Eagles". Lee is often referred to as the "Father of the U.S. Airborne".

== Early life and military career ==
Lee was born in Dunn, North Carolina, one of the seven children of Eldridge Lee and his wife Emma. His father was a merchant. Lee attended Wake Forest College and North Carolina State College. He participated in the Reserve Officer Training Corps (ROTC) program, graduated from NC State, being commissioned as a second lieutenant in the Infantry Branch of the United States Army in 1917, after the American entry into World War I. Lee served in World War I with the American Expeditionary Forces (AEF), which was commanded by General John J. Pershing, on the Western Front. During the war, he served as a platoon and company commander in the 81st Division.

== Between the wars ==
He stayed in the Army during the interwar period and, soon after the war ended, and taking an interest in armored warfare, he attended the tank warfare training schools in Fort Meade, Maryland, and at Versailles, France. In the 1930s, he attended the U.S. Army Command and General Staff School and was promoted to major soon after. On a tour of Europe, he observed the revolutionary new German airborne forces, a concept that he believed the U.S. Army should adopt. He returned to the United States, where he was ordered to the Office of the Chief of Infantry at Washington, D.C. On August 18, 1940, he was promoted to lieutenant colonel.

== World War II ==
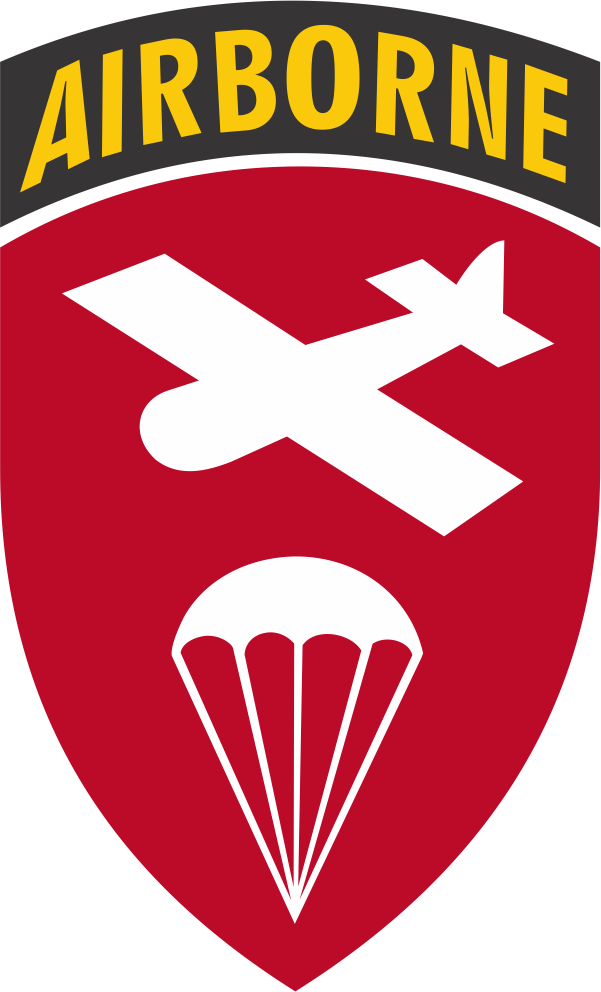
US Army Airborne Command

By the time the United States entered World War II in December 1941, Lee, promoted to the temporary rank of colonel on December 24, was a proponent of airborne warfare. Lee had observed smokejumper training methods within the past year to lay a template for training. President Franklin D. Roosevelt sponsored the concept, and Lee was authorized to form the first paratroop platoon, which was commanded by William T. Ryder. This was followed by the Provisional Parachute Group, and finally the Airborne Command, of which he took command on March 21, 1942, which was followed shortly afterwards by a temporary promotion to brigadier general on April 19.

Airborne Command would take over the following units: 501st Parachute Infantry, 502nd Parachute Infantry, 503rd Parachute Infantry and the 88th Infantry Airborne Battalion. Airborne Command's primary mission was to activate and prepare for combat new airborne units.

Lee was the first commander of the U.S. Army Parachute school at Fort Benning, Georgia, which was also put under control of Airborne Command. He supervised the creation or improvement of facilities at Fort Benning and Fort Bragg as well as Pope Field for jump training.

His Army Distinguished Service Medal was awarded, "for exceptionally meritorious and distinguished services to the Government of the United States, in a duty of great responsibility during World War II."

In August 1942, Lee, promoted on August 9 to the two-star rank of major general, became the first Commanding General (CG) of the newly formed 101st Airborne Division, based at Camp Claiborne, Louisiana. He told his men:

The 101st has no history, but it has a rendezvous with destiny.

He trained the 101st in the United States from its creation until being sent to England in September 1943 to prepare for the Allied invasion of Normandy, codenamed Operation Overlord.

Lee helped plan the American airborne landings in Normandy and trained to jump with his men. On February 5, 1944, a damp, wet and cloudy day, Lee was on his way to observe a training exercise by the 401st Glider Infantry Regiment, commanded by Lieutenant Colonel Joseph "Bud" Harper. Lee suddenly claimed to Harper, "Bud, I can't go any farther, I have a terrible pain in my chest." Harper managed to secure the services of a truck nearby and Lee was evacuated to the 302nd Field Hospital, where doctors diagnosed a serious heart attack. Although the Army wanted to send him back to the United States for better treatment, Lee refused, believing, in vain, that he might return to the 101st, where Lieutenant General Omar Bradley had promised to hold his command.

Lee remained in hospital until March, when he had a second heart attack and was returned to the United States, where he would be retired from the Army for reasons of ill health in late 1944.

There was a question of who would command the 101st. Command initially fell to Brigadier General Don Pratt (who was later killed in Normandy), the assistant division commander, and he assumed he would command the division permanently, but he does not appear to have been seriously considered by General Dwight D. Eisenhower, the Supreme Allied Commander. The division's artillery commander, Brigadier General Anthony McAuliffe, was another possibility. But Eisenhower selected Brigadier General Maxwell D. Taylor, commander of the 82nd Airborne Division Artillery, with combat experience in Sicily and Italy under his belt, to lead the 101st into battle.

== Personal life ==
In June 1918, Lee married Dava Johnson, who traveled with him throughout his military career.

He died at his home in Dunn, North Carolina in 1948.

== Honors ==
The General William C. Lee Airborne Museum is located in Dunn, in his former home.

On October 11, 2004, the U.S. Senate passed a bill to rename the Dunn Post Office, the "General William Carey Lee Post Office."

Lee Residence Hall, one of the largest dormitories at North Carolina State University, is named after William C. Lee.

The Gen. William C. Lee House at Dunn was listed on the National Register of Historic Places in 1983.

[NOTE: The "Bill Lee Freeway" in Charlotte, North Carolina, a section of Interstate 77 is named for William States Lee III (1929–1996), president and CEO of Duke Power and no known relation to the general.]

== Notes ==
Military offices
| Preceded by Newly activated organization | Commanding General Airborne Command; March–August 1942 | Succeeded by Elbridge Chapman |
| Preceded by Newly activated organization | Commanding General 101st Airborne Division; 1942–1944 | Succeeded by Maxwell D. Taylor |
