= George Thomas Washington =

American judge

Senior Judge of the United States Court of Appeals for the District of Columbia Circuit
- In office November 10, 1965 – August 21, 1971

Judge of the United States Court of Appeals for the District of Columbia Circuit
- In office October 21, 1949 – November 10, 1965
- Appointed by: Harry S. Truman
- Preceded by: Seat established by 63 Stat. 493
- Succeeded by: Spottswood William Robinson III

Personal details
- Born: George Thomas Washington; June 24, 1908 Cuyahoga Falls, Ohio
- Died: August 21, 1971 (aged 63) Santa Barbara, California
- Education: Yale University (PhB, LLB); Oxford University (LittB)

George Thomas Washington (June 24, 1908 – August 21, 1971) was a United States circuit judge of the United States Court of Appeals for the District of Columbia Circuit.

== Education and career ==
Washington was born in Cuyahoga Falls, Ohio, the son of William Morrow Washington and Janet Margaret (Thomas) Washington. He was a descendant of Samuel Washington, brother of George Washington. He received a Bachelor of Philosophy degree from Yale University in 1928. He received a Bachelor of Letters in law from Oxford University in 1931 on a Rhodes Scholarship. He received a Bachelor of Laws from Yale Law School in 1932. He was in private practice of law in New York City, New York from 1932 to 1938. He was a faculty member at Cornell Law School from 1938 to 1942 and was a Professor of Law in 1942. He was an attorney for the Office of Emergency Management in 1942. He was a United States economic representative in Baghdad, Iraq from 1942 to 1943. He was Chief of the United States Lend-Lease Mission in Tehran, Iran from 1943 to 1944. He was a special assistant to the United States Attorney General from 1944 to 1946. He was an Assistant Solicitor General of the United States from 1946 to 1949. He was Acting Solicitor General of the United States from 1946 to 1947. He was a legal adviser to the United States Delegation to the United Nations Conference on Freedom of the Press in Geneva, Switzerland in 1948.

== Federal judicial service ==
Washington received a recess appointment from President Harry S. Truman on October 21, 1949, to the United States Court of Appeals for the District of Columbia Circuit, to a new seat created by 63 Stat. 493. He was nominated to the same seat by President Truman on January 5, 1950. He was confirmed by the United States Senate on April 28, 1950, and received his commission on May 1, 1950. He assumed senior status due to a certified disability on November 10, 1965. His service was terminated on August 21, 1971, due to his death at his home in Santa Barbara, California. He was survived by his wife, the former Helen Goodner.

Legal offices
Preceded by Seat established by 63 Stat. 493	Judge of the United States Court of Appeals for the District of Columbia Circuit; 1949–1965	Succeeded by Spottswood William Robinson III
