= Elbridge Chapman =

United States Army general (1895–1954)

Elbridge G. Chapman Jr.
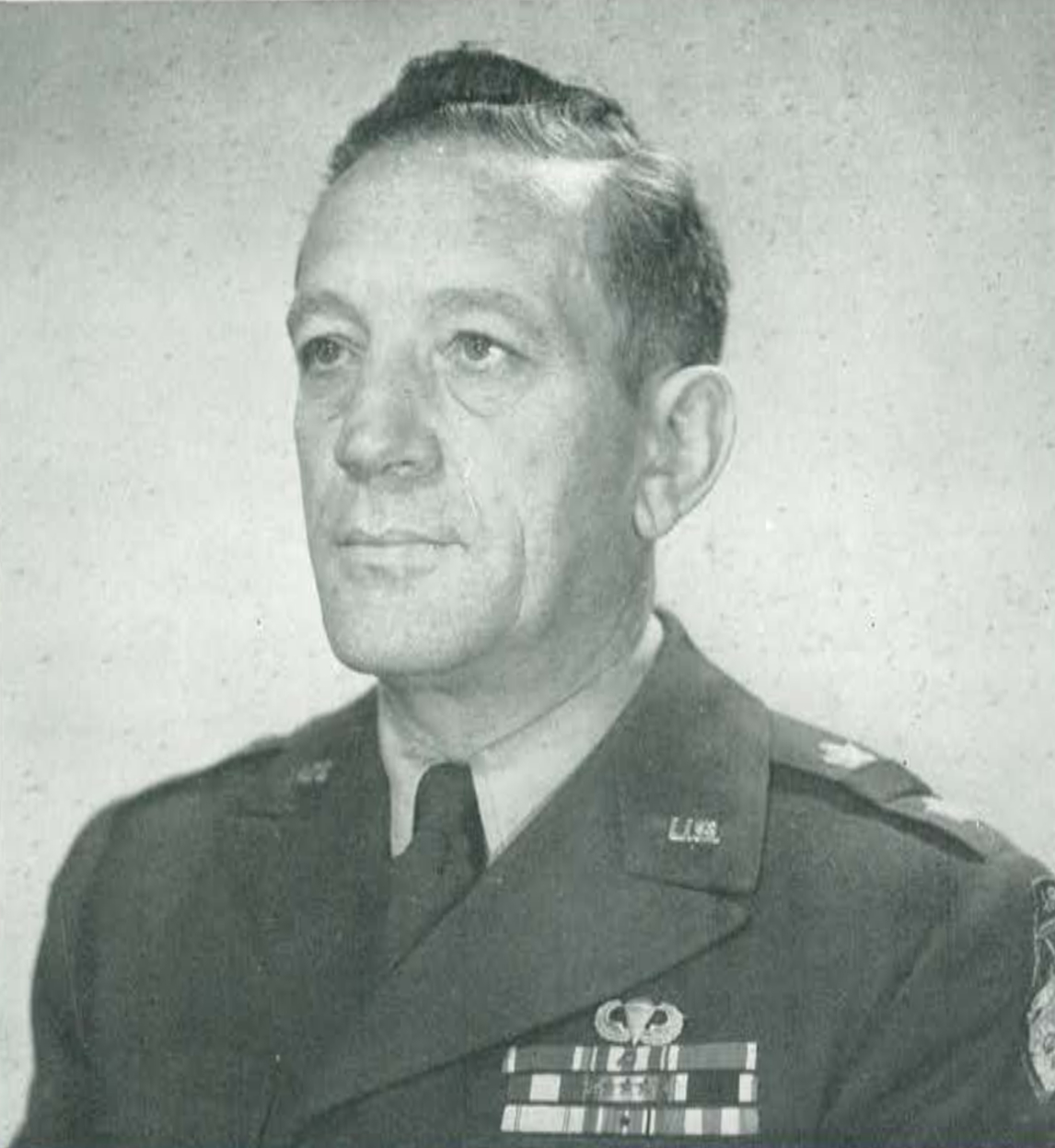
- Chapman as 13th Airborne Division commander c. 1945
- Born: November 20, 1895; Denver, Colorado, U.S.
- Died: July 6, 1954 (aged 58); San Bruno, California, U.S.
- Military career
- Allegiance: United States
- Branch: United States Army
- Service years: 1917–1946
- Rank: Major General
- Nickname: "Gerry"
- Service number: 0-6232
- Unit: Infantry Branch
- Commands: 88th Glider Infantry Battalion; Airborne Command; 13th Airborne Division
- Conflicts: World War I World War II
- Awards: Distinguished Service Cross; Army Distinguished Service Medal; Silver Star

Elbridge Gerry Chapman Jr. (November 20, 1895 – July 6, 1954) was a senior United States Army officer who served in both World War I and World War II. During the latter he commanded the 13th Airborne Division, but saw no action.

== Early life and education ==
Chapman attended the University of Colorado, where he played college football and was captain of the 1916 Colorado Silver and Gold football team.

== Military career ==
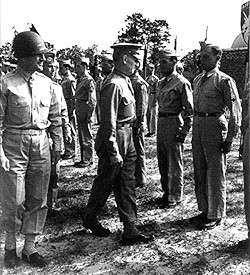
Major General Elbridge Chapman (left), commander of the 13th Airborne Division, and Lieutenant General Lesley J. McNair, commander of Army Ground Forces, inspect troopers of the Elbridge's division, May 13, 1944

Chapman entered the United States Army in 1917, due to the American entry into World War I and was commissioned as a second lieutenant into the Infantry Branch. He served with distinction on the Western Front in France as a company commander with the 5th Machine Gun Battalion (attached to the 1st Battalion, 9th Infantry Regiment, 2nd Infantry Division) and was awarded the Distinguished Service Cross and the Silver Star Citation for valor.

During the interwar period Chapman remained in the army, and by the time the United States entered World War II in December 1941 he was an enthusiastic supporter of the army's rapidly growing airborne forces, commanding the 88th Glider Infantry Battalion.

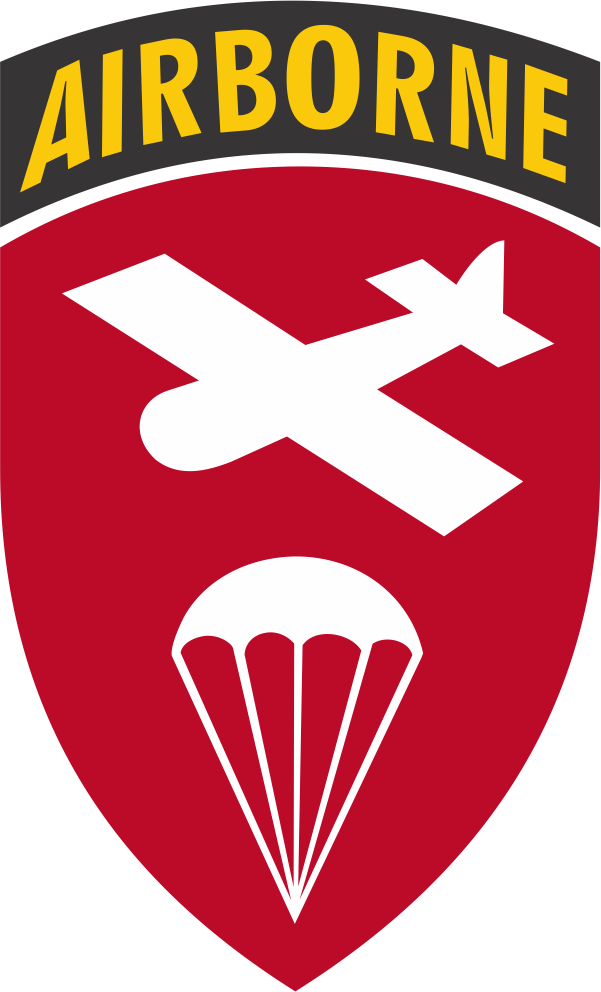
US Airborne Command

In August 1942, Chapman became the commander of Airborne Command and was promoted to Brigadier General. He oversaw the expansion of the command after both the 82nd and 101st Airborne Divisions were leaving for Europe. He oversaw the completion of the Army Air Force glider school and base at Laurinburg-Maxton, North Carolina. Under his command, Second Infantry Division was trained for glider air insertion at Fort Sam Houston, Texas. In November 1942 he oversaw the activation of the 11th Airborne Division and in December the 17th Airborne Division. In April 1943 he oversaw the movement of HHC Airborne Command to the newly opened Camp Mackall, North Carolina.

In November 1943, he became the Assistant Division Commander of the 13th Airborne Division, eventually commanding the division in North-West Europe, though he never commanded it in action.

Chapman retired from the army in 1946, after almost thirty years of service, and died in San Bruno, California, in July 1954, aged 58.

== Awards ==
- Parachutist Badge
- Distinguished Service Cross
- Distinguished Service Medal (U.S. Army)
- Silver Star with oak leaf cluster
- Purple Heart
- Mexican Border Service Medal
- World War I Victory Medal
- Army of Occupation of Germany Medal
- American Defense Service Medal
- American Campaign Medal
- European-African-Middle Eastern Campaign Medal with one campaign star
- World War II Victory Medal

== Dates of rank ==
- 1st Sergeant, Troop D, 1st Cavalry, Colorado, National Guard - 20 June 1916 to 28 September 1916
- 2nd Lieutenant, Infantry, Regular Army - 14 June 1917 (accepted 16 July 1917)
- 1st Lieutenant - 14 June 1917
- Captain (temporary) 22 November 1917
- Resigned - 15 September 1919
- 1st Lieutenant, Infantry - 1 July 1920 (accepted 21 October 1920)
- Captain - 1 July 1920
- Major - 1 August 1935
- Lieutenant Colonel - 26 July 1940
- Colonel, Army of the United States - 24 December 1941
- Brigadier General, Army of the United States - 20 July 1942
- Major General, Army of the United States - 17 March 1943
- Retired - 30 November 1946

== In media ==
Chapman was portrayed in the television miniseries Band of Brothers by David Andrews.

Military offices
Preceded by William C. Lee	Commanding General Airborne Command; 1942–1943	Succeeded by Leo Donovan
Preceded by George W. Griner Jr.	Commanding General 13th Airborne Division; 1943–1946	Succeeded by Post deactivated
