= Gerhard Gesell =

American judge (1910–1993)

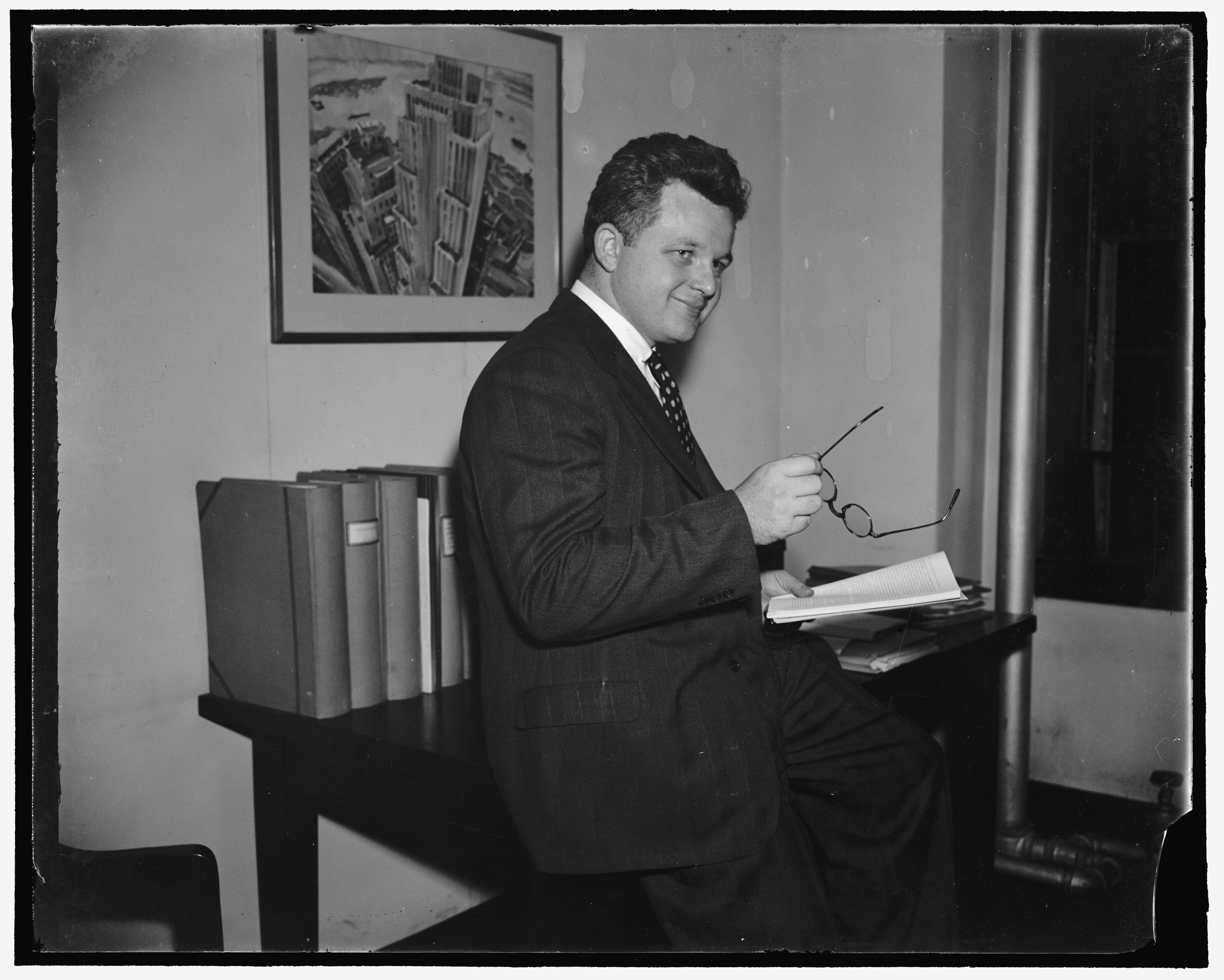

Senior Judge of the United States District Court for the District of Columbia
- In office January 22, 1993 – February 19, 1993

Judge of the United States District Court for the District of Columbia
- In office December 12, 1967 – January 22, 1993
- Appointed by: Lyndon B. Johnson
- Preceded by: Spottswood William Robinson III
- Succeeded by: Paul L. Friedman

Personal details
- Born: Gerhard Alden Gesell; June 16, 1910 Los Angeles, California, U.S.
- Died: February 19, 1993 (aged 82) Washington, D.C., U.S.
- Education: Yale University (BA, LLB)

Gerhard Alden Gesell (June 16, 1910 – February 19, 1993) was a United States district judge of the United States District Court for the District of Columbia.

== Education and career ==
Born in Los Angeles, California, Gesell received a Bachelor of Arts degree from Yale University in 1932 and a Bachelor of Laws from Yale Law School in 1935. He was a trial attorney for the Securities and Exchange Commission from 1935 to 1940 and a technical advisor to the Securities and Exchange Commission Chairman from 1940 to 1941. He was in private practice in Washington, D.C., from 1941 to 1967. In 1945 and 1946, he served as Chief Assistant Counsel for the Democrats during the Pearl Harbor hearings. He chaired the President's Committee on Equal Opportunity in the Armed Forces from 1962 to 1964.

== Federal judicial service ==
On November 29, 1967, Gesell was nominated by US president Lyndon B. Johnson to a seat on the United States District Court for the District of Columbia vacated by Judge Spottswood William Robinson III. Gesell was confirmed by the US Senate on December 7, 1967, and received his commission on December 12, 1967. Gesell assumed senior status on January 22, 1993, and served in that status until his death on February 19, 1993, in Washington, DC.

=== Watergate trials ===
In 1973, Judge Gesell ruled illegal the firing of special prosecutor Archibald Cox by Acting Attorney General Robert Bork under the orders of President Richard Nixon in the so-called Saturday Night Massacre.

In 1974, Gesell presided over trials of the so-called Watergate Seven that arose from dozens of felony charges in the Watergate scandal. All of the defendants had held cabinet rank or senior staff positions in the White House of President Nixon. Those convicted or pleading guilty in these trials were John N. Mitchell, H. R. Haldeman, John Ehrlichman, Charles Colson, Gordon C. Strachan, and Robert Mardian. Kenneth W. Parkinson was acquitted. Gesell later ruled that the office tape recordings of President Nixon were in the public domain because they had been played during a Watergate trial; his finding would be upheld by the Supreme Court.

=== Iran-Contra trial ===
In 1989, Gesell was the presiding judge in the government's case against National Security Adviser Oliver North, who was convicted of aiding and abetting obstruction of a congressional inquiry into the Iran-Contra arms sale, of ordering the destruction of documents, and of accepting an illegal gratuity. On July 5, 1989, Gesell probated North's three-year prison sentence but fined him $150,000, sentenced him to 1,200 hours community service, and placed him on two years' probation. Those convictions, however, were later vacated by an appeals court because North had been granted immunity for his testimony to Congress. After further hearings on the immunity issue, Gesell dismissed all charges against North on September 16, 1991.

== Sources ==
Legal offices
| Preceded by Spottswood William Robinson III | Judge of the United States District Court for the District of Columbia; 1967–1993 | Succeeded by Paul L. Friedman |
