= 458th Parachute Field Artillery Battalion =

The 458th Parachute Field Artillery Battalion (458th PFAB) is an inactive airborne field artillery battalion of the United States Army. Active with the 13th Airborne Division from 1943–1946, the battalion deployed to France but never saw combat.

== Lineage ==
- Constituted 26 December 1942 in the Army of the United States as the 458th Parachute Field Artillery Battalion and assigned to the 13th Airborne Division
- Activated 20 February 1943 at Fort Bragg, North Carolina
- Inactivated 25 February 1946 at Fort Bragg, North Carolina

== Campaign participation credit ==
- World War II: Central Europe

== See also ==
- 13th Airborne Division
- 13th Airborne Division Artillery
