= Paul L. Friedman =

American judge (born 1944)

Senior Judge of the United States District Court for the District of Columbia
- Incumbent
- Assumed office December 31, 2009

Judge of the United States District Court for the District of Columbia
- In office June 16, 1994 – December 31, 2009
- Appointed by: Bill Clinton
- Preceded by: Gerhard Gesell
- Succeeded by: Beryl Howell

Personal details
- Born: February 20, 1944 (age 82) Buffalo, New York, U.S.
- Education: Cornell University (BA); University at Buffalo (JD)

Paul Lawrence Friedman (born February 20, 1944) is a senior United States district judge of the United States District Court for the District of Columbia. He serves as secretary of the American Law Institute.

== Education and career ==
Friedman was born in Buffalo, New York. He received his Bachelor of Arts from Cornell University in 1965, where he was president of the Quill and Dagger society and a member of Zeta Beta Tau. He received his Juris Doctor from University at Buffalo Law School in 1968. He began his legal career as a law clerk to Judge Aubrey Eugene Robinson Jr. of the United States District Court for the District of Columbia from 1968 to 1969, and then for Judge Roger Robb of the United States Court of Appeals for the District of Columbia Circuit from 1969 to 1970. He was an Assistant United States Attorney for the District of Columbia from 1970 to 1974. He was an Assistant United States Solicitor General from 1974 to 1976. He was in private practice of law at the firm of White & Case in Washington, D.C. from 1976 to 1994.

In June 1984, Friedman was elected to the American Law Institute and was elected to the ALI Council in October 1998. He began his first three-year term as ALI Secretary in 2013.

== Federal judicial service ==
Friedman was nominated by President Bill Clinton on March 22, 1994, to a seat vacated by Gerhard A. Gesell. He was confirmed by the United States Senate on June 15, 1994, and received his commission on June 16, 1994. He assumed senior status on December 31, 2009.

=== Notable cases ===
Among Friedman's notable cases is the continuing supervision of John Hinckley Jr., the would-be assassin of President Ronald Reagan. Friedman has issued rulings that relaxed the restrictions on Hinckley by allowing him to leave the grounds of St. Elizabeths Hospital to spend more days each month visiting his mother's home town of Williamsburg, Virginia. On July 27, 2016, it was announced that Hinckley would be allowed to permanently reside there.

Friedman also presides over In re: Rail Freight Fuel Surcharge Antitrust Litigation, an ongoing MDL (multidistrict litigation) that saw multiple appeals to the D.C. Circuit in a battle for class certification that lasted over a decade.

Friedman also notably dismissed a lawsuit filed by 26 members of Congress who contended that President Clinton has had no legal authority to continue U.S. participation in the airstrikes against Yugoslavia. The bipartisan lawsuit sought to enforce timetables in the largely ignored Vietnam-era War Powers Act, which would have required Clinton to obtain congressional approval or terminate U.S. involvement in Kosovo by May 25, two months after the start of the action.

In 2026, Friedman ruled against a US Department of Defense policy restricting the press credentials of journalists who declined new reporting restrictions, in a case brought by The New York Times. He ordered the Pentagon to reinstate seven of the newspaper's journalists' credentials and refused its request to stay the ruling pending appeal.

== Speech deploring attacks on judges ==
Delivering the annual Judge Thomas A. Flannery Lecture on November 6, 2019, Friedman entered the political fray by deploring President Donald Trump's rhetorical attacks on judges, saying they “violate all recognized democratic norms" and are starting to "undermine faith in the rule of law itself."

“We are witnessing a chief executive who criticizes virtually every judicial decision that doesn’t go his way and denigrates judges who rule against him, sometimes in very personal terms. He seems to view the courts and the justice system as obstacles to be attacked and undermined, not as a coequal branch to be respected even when he disagrees with its decisions.”

== See also ==
- List of Jewish American jurists

Legal offices
Preceded by Gerhard Gesell	Judge of the United States District Court for the District of Columbia; 1994–2009	Succeeded by Beryl Howell
