= 515th Parachute Infantry Regiment =

- Active: 31 May 1943 – 25 February 1946
- Disbanded: 25 February 1946
- Country: United States
- Branch: United States Army
- Type: Airborne forces
- Role: Parachute infantry
- Size: Regiment
- Nickname: Jumping Wolves
- Engagements: World War II

Commanders
- Notable commanders: Harvey Jablonsky

The 515th Parachute Infantry Regiment was an airborne, specifically a parachute infantry, regiment of the United States Army during World War II. The unit was used to provide replacements for overseas, but was later assigned to the 13th Airborne Division and sent to the Western Front in anticipation of combat with the Germans and was later en route to the Pacific Theatre when the war came to an end.

== Activation At Ft. Benning, Georgia ==
The 515th was activated as cadre on 31 May 1943 at Fort Benning, Georgia. Initially the regiment processed graduates of the parachute school. It was only on 1 December 1943 that orders came down from Airborne Command placing the 515th in full activation. It is for this reason that the 515th is considered the most junior of the US Army's parachute regiments.

Colonel Julian B. Lindsay was the regiment's first commanding officer of the 'Jumping Wolves', taking command of the 184-man cadre provided by the 507th Parachute Infantry Regiment. It didn't take long for the 515th to come to full strength.

The unit took its first casualty in mid-June 1943 when its First Battalion CO Lt. Col. J. C. Hite plunged to his death over the Alabama Area. As a result, the Amphitheatre in that area is now named after him.

Initially only the First Battalion was Jump Qualified, the Second and Third Battalions being composed of unqualified men from Special Units, however by the end of January 1944 the whole regiment was wearing its Jump Wings.

It was during this early period that the regiment lost some men as replacements overseas, famed General John K. Singlaub returned from an exercise to find his platoon having been sent overseas as replacements, an event which led to his eventual transfer to OSS Jedburgh Team JAMES, beginning his long career in Special Operations.

== Assignment To The 13th Airborne ==
On 7 March 1944 the 515th joined the 13th Airborne Division at Camp Mackall, North Carolina, replacing the 513th Parachute Infantry Regiment, which had been reassigned to the 17th Airborne Division.

In April and May 1944 the Regiment was hit hard, again being stripped for replacements overseas, drastically setting back the Regiments training schedule. To replace these losses the 541st Parachute Infantry Regiment was ordered to provide men to fill the holes left by those who went.

The 515th began to train in earnest for an overseas deployment with the 13th Airborne. Indications here for a deployment to the Pacific Theatre, a rumour which was further fuelled when 23 Japanese-Americans were attached to the unit to assist with Regimental training. Half these men would play the enemy, the other half would be interpreters. These men gained great respect from the men of the 515th and later, when it became apparent that the Regiment would not go to the Pacific, these men were missed.

== Maneuvers ==
By mid September 1944 the 13th Airborne was ready for its final exams for movement overseas, taking the form of a large Airborne Maneuver. The 515th was based out of Laurinburg-Maxton Army Airbase, with the initial assignment of capturing 'enemy' airfields, allowing glider reinforcements to land.

Not all went according to plan as high winds and Air Corps inexperience resulted in bad scattering of the jumpers, however the 515th recovered and moved out capturing the Camp Mackall Airport. The rest of the maneuvers proceeded somewhat smoothly, with one exception being a trooper who was in the lead of a creek crossing falling asleep against a tree resulting in his buddies halting and waiting for him to move out, despite being up to their waists in swamp.

Upon completion of the exercise the 13th was cleared for deployment overseas. In December 1944 the Battle of the Bulge was in full swing and the 13th was ordered to move out to the European Theatre of Operations immediately.

By 30 January, the men of the 515th were on their way.

== Strategic Reserve ETO ==
The 13th Airborne Division docked at Le Havre on 8 February 1945 and moved out to Camp Lucky Strike near St. Valery-en-Caux, France. It was here that the 515th acquired its new commanding officer, Colonel Harvey J. Jablonsky, who was already in Europe awaiting the men's arrival.

Life at Lucky Strike was miserable, the men were tasked with sprucing the area up, creating gravel paths in mud which simply swallowed up any gravel the men tried to lay down. Moral was low and the rain water high. Mercifully the men moved out to Auxerre, France nine days later.

Auxerre was a former French Army Garrison, consisting of four story barracks, surrounding a quadrangle, which was full of trash, left by the Germans. The men set about fixing the place up.

It was at this time that the men participated in Operation Comet, a training mission in anticipation of jumping the Rhine. The men were not told this was an exercise until they arrived at the marshalling area. The Exercise was a success and the men returned to Auxerre.

The Regiment sent some volunteers to England to participate in the XVIII Airborne Corps Pathfinder school, which was held Chalgrove, Oxford, England. One of these men remained with the Corps and eventually was one of the first men to jump into Germany.

The men were called out to marshalling areas again for more operations which would never come off. This being the essence of their role as Strategic Reserve, to be ready to jump anywhere, anytime, they were 'Troopers of Opportunity'.

Time and again the men kitted up, boarded their aircraft, only to be told that the DZ had been overrun by friendly forces and it was back to the Marshalling Area Blues.

In May the war ended, with the men still sitting behind the barbed wire, the war passed them by.

== Redeployment To The Pacific ==
After a period of celebration, sports and training, the 13th Airborne was the second division earmarked for deployment to the Pacific Theatre of Operations. In July 1945 the men left Auxere for Camp Pittsburgh near Reims. The men boarded Liberty Ships at Le Havre and started for the United States, a stopover to the Pacific.

While they were at sea, the Atomic Bombs were dropped, ending the war in the Pacific. The men of the 515th were jubilant, the war was over and they were alive. The ships docked at Piermont Pier on 23 August and the men were sent home on leave, or discharged.

== Deactivation ==
While the war had passed the 13th Airborne Division and the 515th by, no one will ever know how many lives were saved by not going into action. The 515th Parachute Infantry Regiment was on the U.S. Army's rolls and still functioning when it was shut down on 25 February 1946, its men transferring to the U.S. 82nd Airborne Division.
