= 88th Infantry Regiment (United States) =

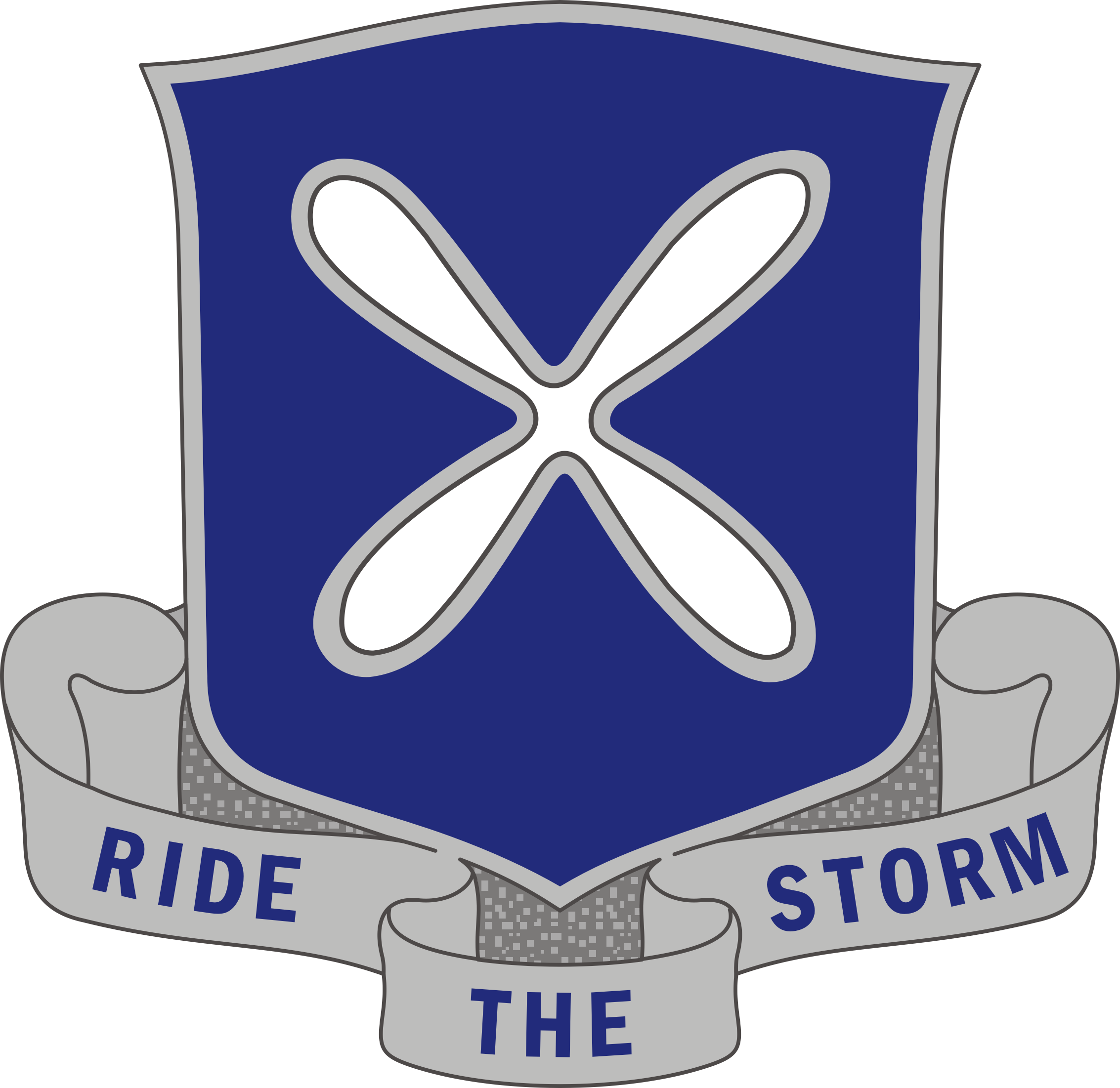
- Distinctive unit insignia.
- Active: 1941-1945
- Country: United States
- Branch: United States Army
- Type: Light infantry
- Role: Glider infantry
- Motto: "Ride the Storm"

Insignia
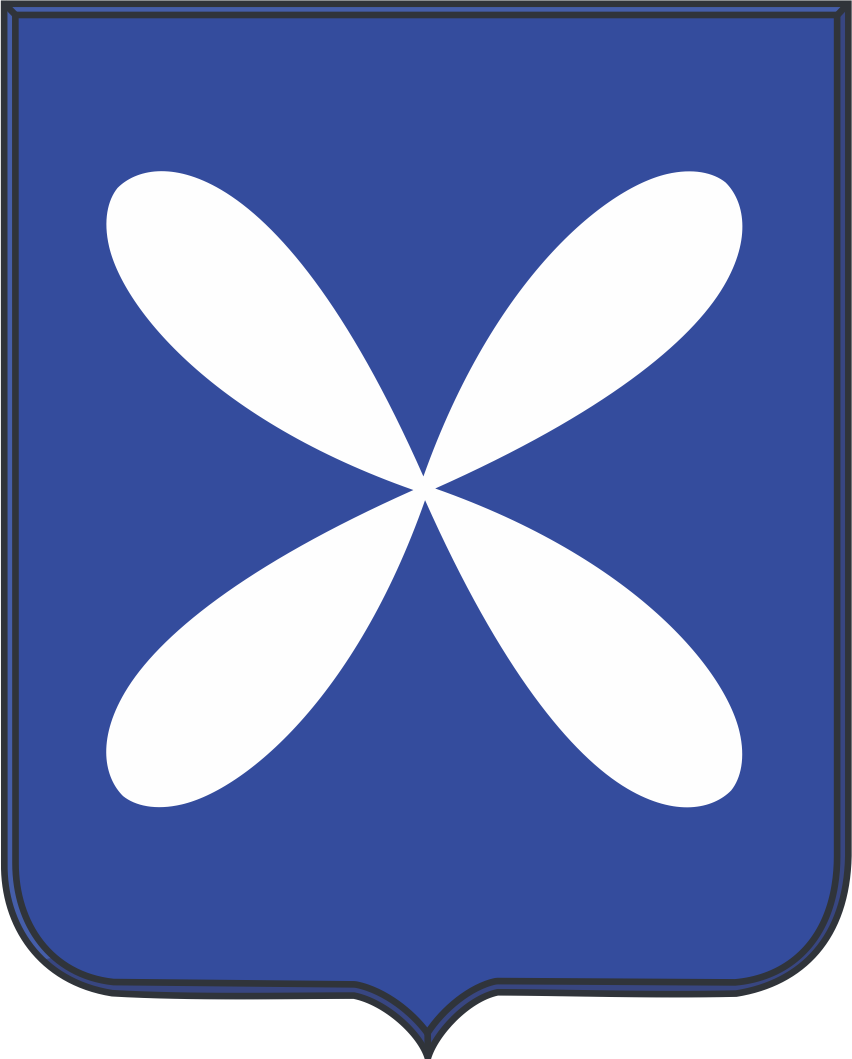
- Coat of arms

- The Glider Badge: Worn by U.S. Army airborne soldiers who rode gliders into combat

The 88th Infantry Regiment was an infantry regiment of the United States Army. It was created as the 88th Airborne Infantry Battalion on 10 October 1941 during World War II as the U.S. Army's first glider infantry unit.

== Unit history ==
Attached to the U.S. Army Infantry School at Fort Benning, Georgia, the unit was authorized a strength of 27 officers and 500 enlisted men. In May 1942 it was moved to Fort Bragg, North Carolina, and expanded into the 88th Glider Infantry Regiment. All equipment and personnel assigned to the regiment were designed to be carried in the Waco CG-4A glider.

The regiment was stationed at Fort Meade, South Dakota, from February to November 1943. Troops were trained in infantry tactics including forced night marches, although they also had mock gliders and a tower north of the fort for practice parachute drops. The soldiers at Fort Meade were taken to Alliance, Nebraska, for their airborne training, and the glider pilots received their flight training there as well. In April 1943 the regiment was assigned to the 1st Airborne Infantry Brigade along with the 507th Parachute Infantry Regiment and the 326th Glider Infantry Regiment. Both the 88th GIR and the 326th GIR were organized as two-battalion regiments.

The 88th was assigned to the 13th Airborne Division on 3 December 1943 and landed in France in February 1945 but saw no combat. On 1 March 1945, the 88th GIR was disbanded and its assets were used to form a third battalion in the 326th GIR. This was in line with similar reorganizations of the 17th, 82nd, and 101st Airborne Divisions that gave each a single three-battalion glider infantry regiment, rather than two, two-battalion glider regiments.

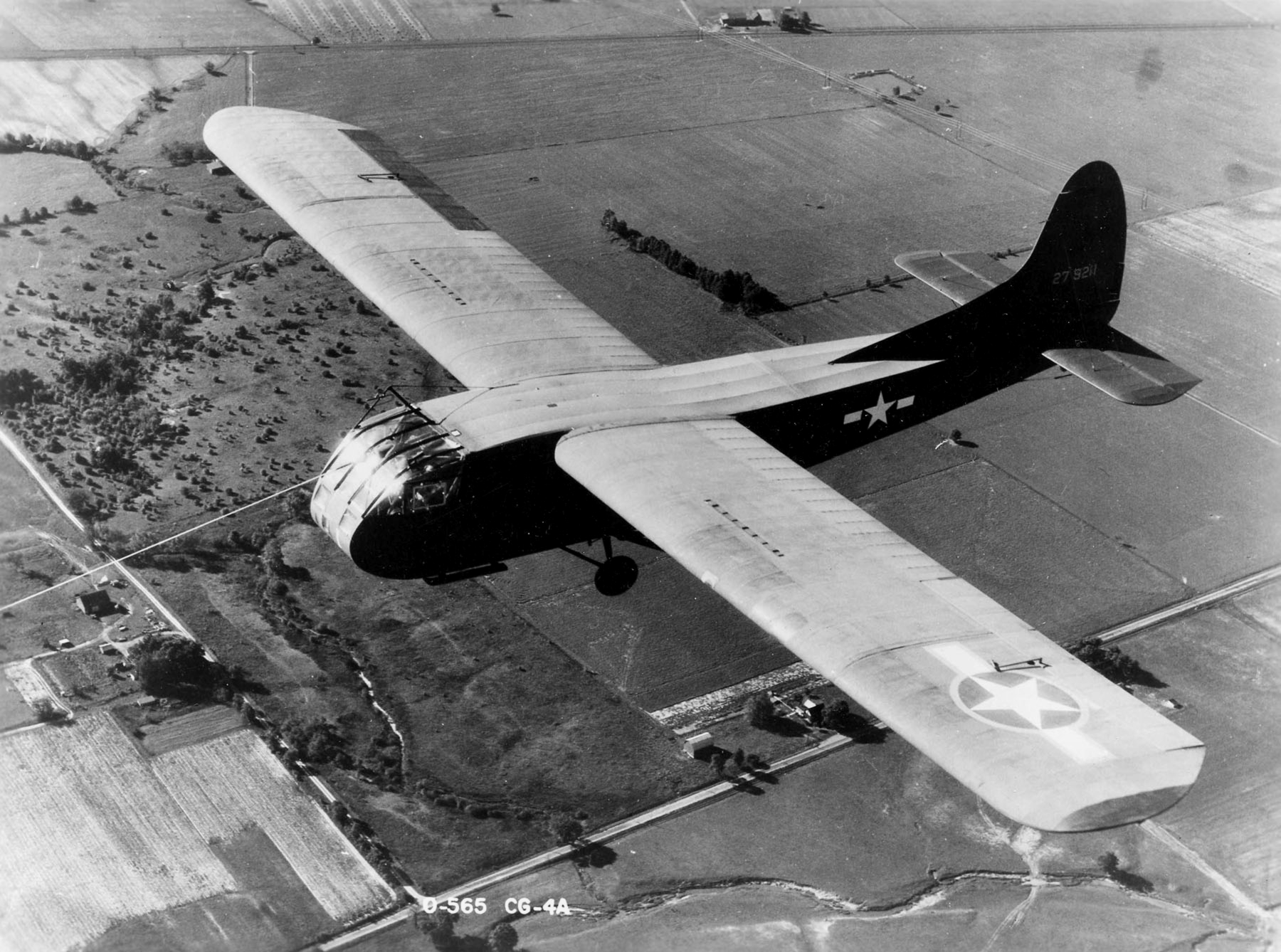

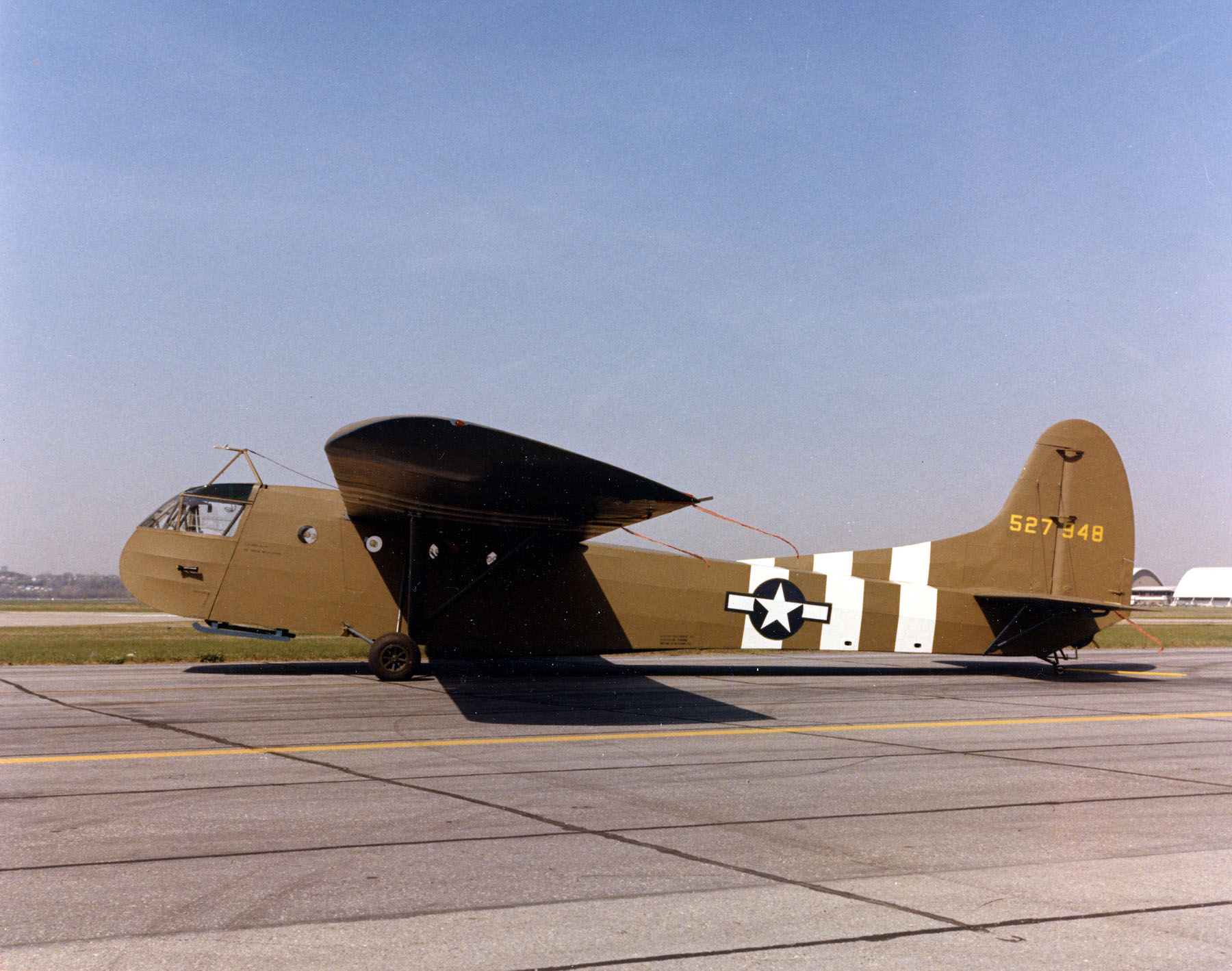

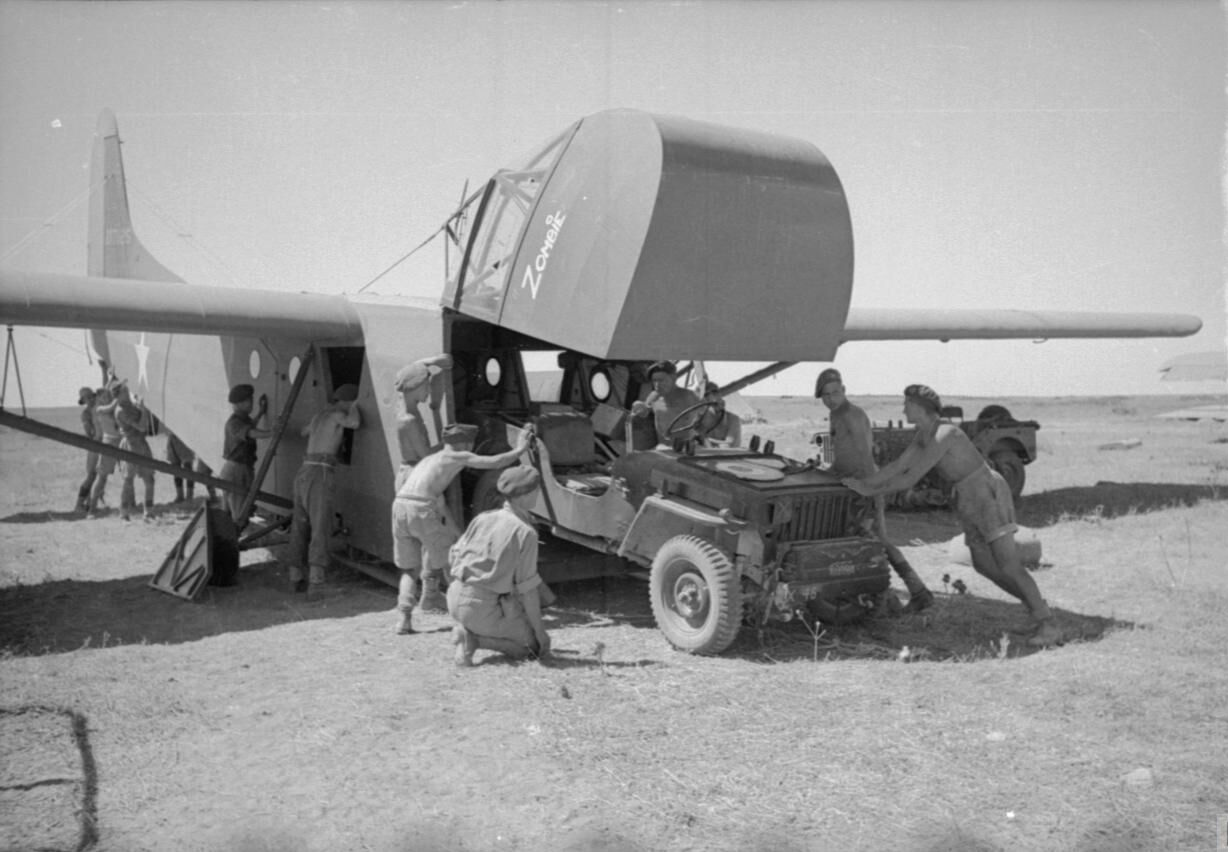
Jeep loading onto Waco glider

== Distinctive unit insignia ==
- Description

A Silver color metal and enamel device 1 1/4 inches (3.2 cm) in height overall consisting of a shield blazoned: Azure, a cross pendal saltirewise Argent. Attached below and to the sides of the shield a Silver tripartite scroll inscribed "RIDE THE STORM" in Blue letters.

- Symbolism

The shield is blue for Infantry. The symbol produces the effect of two crossed "8’s," which may be alluded to as canting heraldry. It also has the appearance of a propeller, indicating connection with aviation.

- Background

The distinctive unit insignia was originally approved for the 88th Infantry Airborne Battalion on 17 December 1941. It was redesignated for the 88th Infantry Regiment on 29 September 1942. The insignia was rescinded on 10 February 1959.

== Coat of arms ==
- Blazon
  - Shield: Azure, a cross pendal saltirewise Argent.
  - Crest None.
  - Motto RIDE THE STORM.
- Symbolism
  - Shield: The shield is blue for Infantry. The symbol produces the effect of two crossed "8’s," which may be alluded to as canting heraldry. It also has the appearance of a propeller, indicating connection with aviation.
  - Crest None.
- Background: The coat of arms was originally approved for the 88th Infantry Airborne Battalion on 17 December 1941. It was amended to correct the history on 23 January 1942. The insignia was redesignated for the 88th Infantry Regiment on 30 September 1942. It was rescinded on 10 February 1959.
