= Glider Badge =

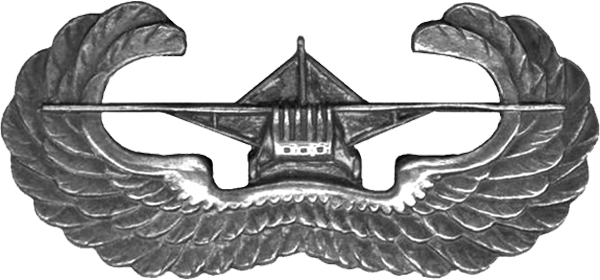
- Type: Special skills badge
- Awarded for: Military glider operations
- Presented by: United States Army
- Status: Discontinued
- Established: 2 June 1944–3 May 1961
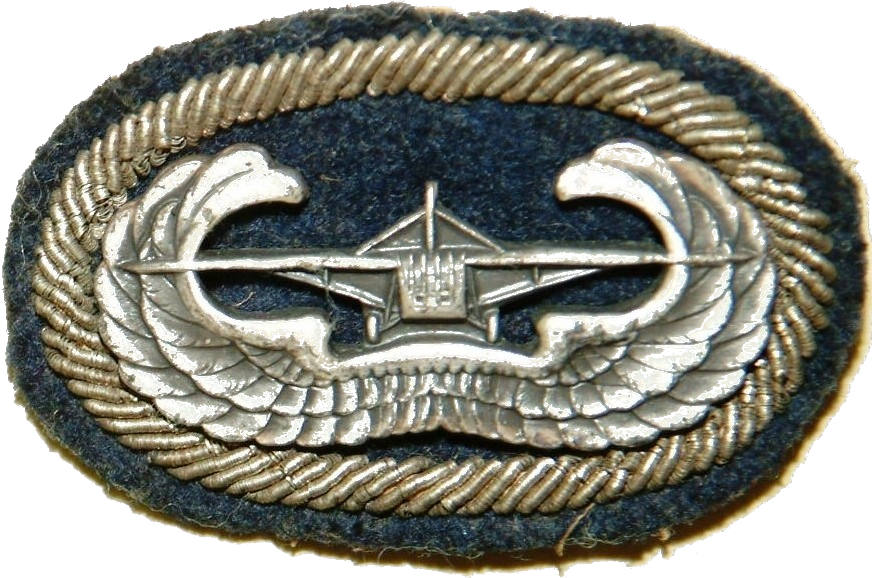
- Glider Badge with airborne background trimming from an unknown WWII glider infantry regiment

The Glider Badge was a special skills badge of the United States Army. According to the U.S. Army Institute of Heraldry, the badge was awarded to personnel who had "been assigned or attached to a glider or airborne unit or to the Airborne Department of the Infantry School; satisfactorily completed a course of instruction, or participated in at least one combat glider mission into enemy-held territory.

== History ==
The badge was authorized on 2 June 1944 and discontinued on 3 May 1961; it is still authorized for wear on U.S. Army uniforms.

After World War II, the Glider Badge was authorized to any service member who had completed glider unit training at the Airborne School.

In the post-World War II years, the US Army converted its remaining glider units to parachute. For example, the 325th Glider Infantry Regiment of the 82d Airborne Division was reorganized and redesignated on 15 December 1947 as the 325th Infantry Regiment (no longer glider infantry), and then reorganized and redesignated again on 15 December 1948 as the 325th Airborne Infantry. Likewise, the 319th Glider Field Artillery Battalion, also part of the 82d Airborne Division, was reorganized and redesignated on 15 December 1947 as the 319th Field Artillery Battalion, and then reorganized and redesignated on 15 December 1948 as the 319th Airborne Field Artillery Battalion. Although glider units had ceased to exist, the badge was not formally rescinded until 3 May 1961; however, it remained authorized for wear by those who earned it.

Glider training was included in the United States Army's basic Airborne course until 1949, which at that time lasted five weeks. The first week of the course covered air transportability training, which included glider training. During late summer of that year, a glider crashed, killing many of those on board, and glider training came to an end.

== Garrison cap insignia ==
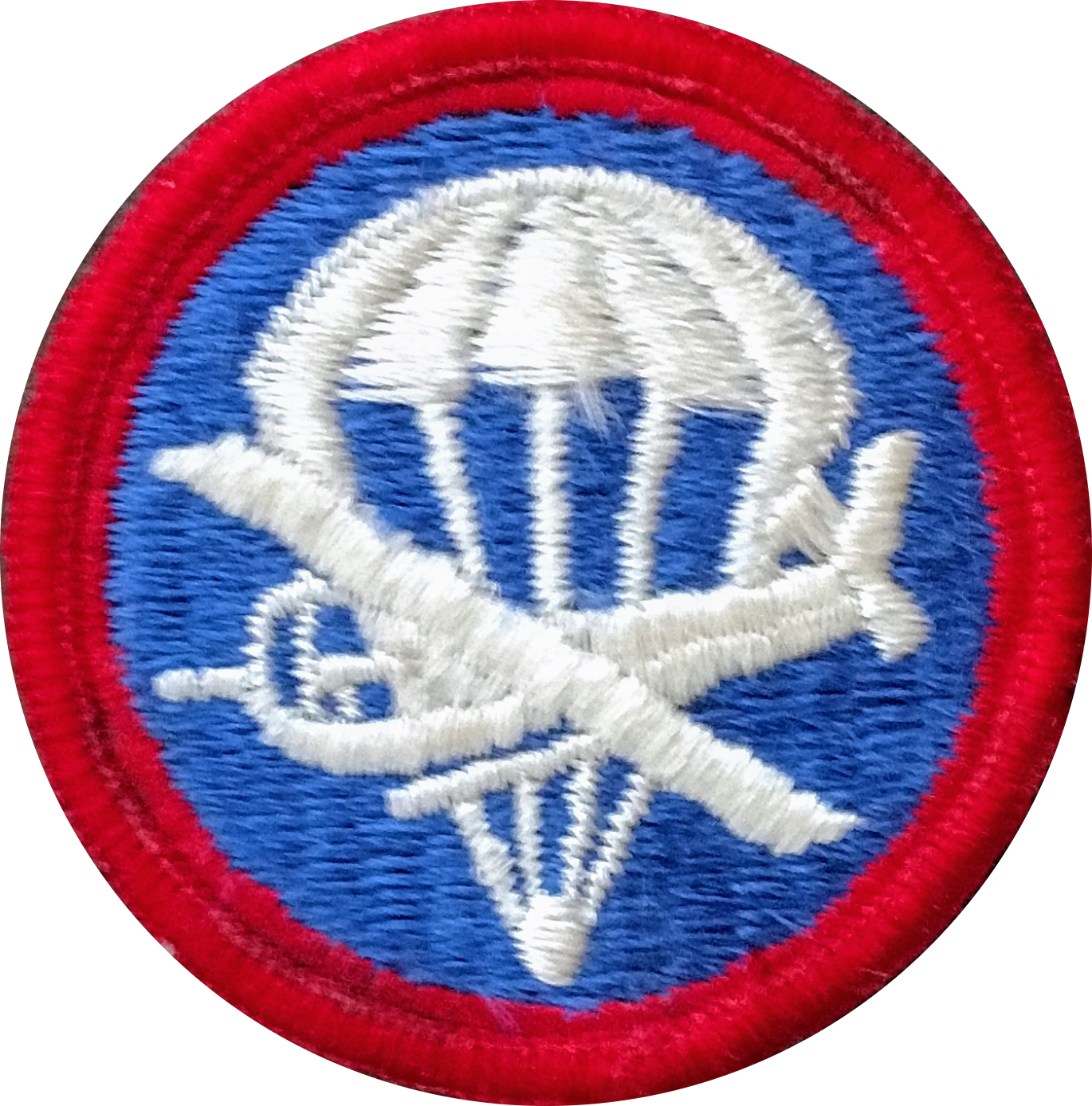
The Airborne Insignia (enlisted version), which combined the parachute and glider garrison cap insignias of World War II

A cloth circular Airborne (Glider) Insignia, similar to the Airborne (Parachute) Insignia, was worn on the garrison cap of active glider units until the Army combined the parachute and glider insignias into one Airborne Insignia worn by all airborne and glider-born units. Glider-borne soldiers wore a background trimming (a.k.a. a cloth oval) behind their Glider Badge to signify assignment to glider units.

The color pattern of the background trimming varied depending upon the unit.

In 1944 the separate parachute and glider insignias with infantry blue or artillery red background were merged into a combined parachute and glider on a blue base with a red circle. (Note: During World War II the term "Airborne" included parachute, glider, and air-landing units. With the elimination of glider and air-landing units from the force structure in the post-war years, Airborne became synonymous with parachute units only.)

== Glider Operations during World War II ==
A U.S. Army film describing the use of gliders during Operation Market

U.S. Army glider units participated in eight glider-airborne operations during World War II:

- Invasion of Sicily (Operation HUSKY) July 9–13, 1943
- 1st Air Commando Group in Burma (Operation THURSDAY) March–May 1944
- Invasion of Normandy (Operation NEPTUNE, airborne phase of Operation OVERLORD) June 6–8, 1944
- Invasion of southern France (Operation DRAGOON) August 15, 1944
- Invasion of Netherlands (Operation MARKET, airborne phase of Operation MARKET GARDEN) September 17–23, 1944
- Re-supply of Bastogne (a flight on December 25, 1944, and Operation REPULSE) December 26–27, 1944
- Rhine River crossing at Wesel (Operation VARSITY) March 24, 1945
- Aparri, Luzon, PI (Operation GYPSY) June 23, 1945

== See also ==
- Obsolete badges of the United States military
- Badges of the United States Army
- United States Army Airborne School
- Parachutist Badge
- United States Army Air Assault School
- Air Assault Badge
- Military glider
