= Theresia of Dietrichstein =

German noblewoman

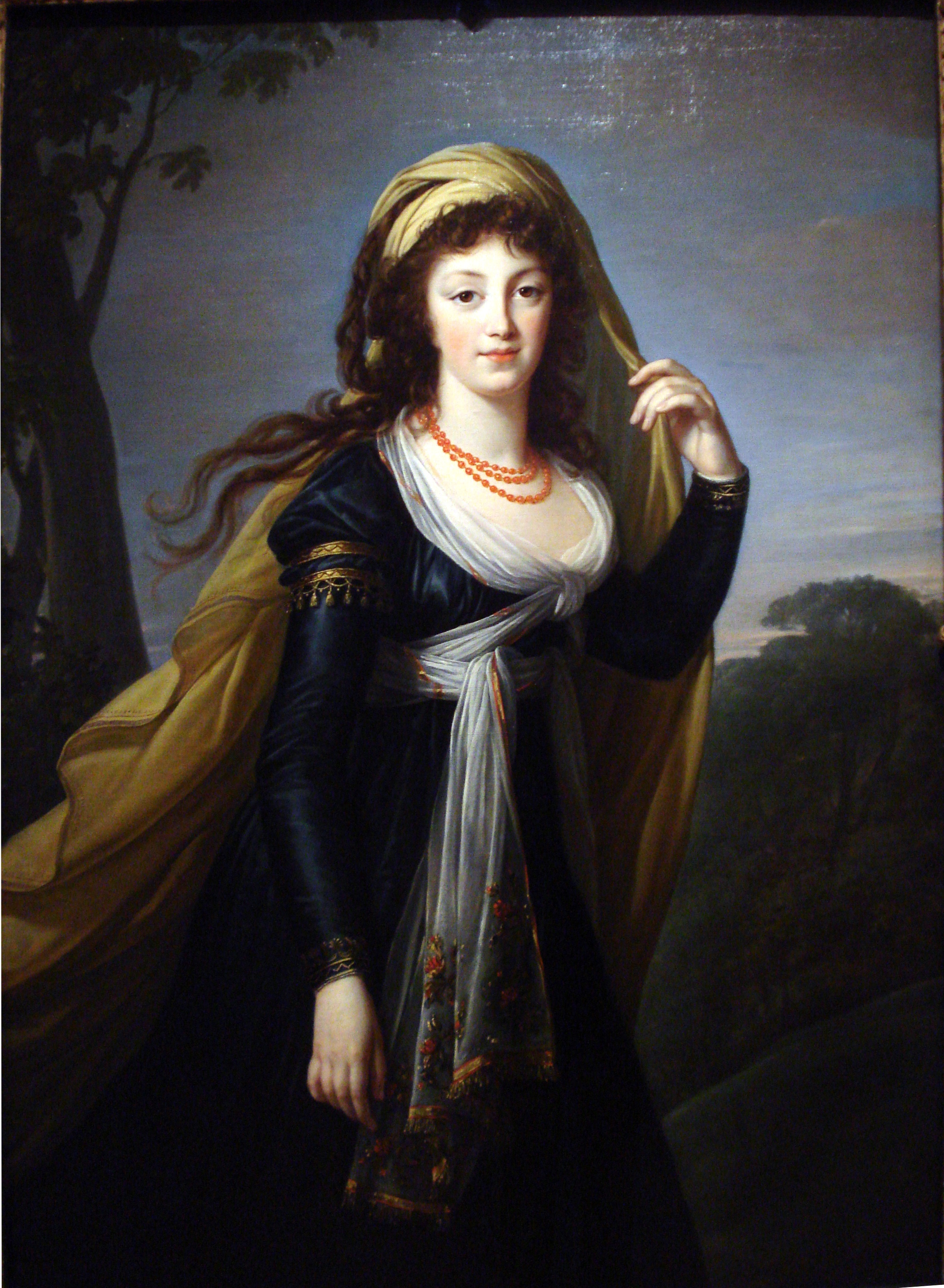
Theresia, Countess Kinsky. Portrait by Louise Élisabeth Vigée Le Brun, 1793.

Theresia of Dietrichstein (Maria Theresia Johanna Nepomucena Josepha Juliana; 11 August 1768 – 16 September 1822), was a German noblewoman; a member of the House of Dietrichstein and by her two marriages member of the House of Kinsky and member of the House of Merveldt.

== Early life ==
She was the fourth child and second (but eldest and only surviving) daughter of Karl Johann Baptist, 7th Prince of Dietrichstein and his wife, Countess Maria Christina of Thun und Hohenstein, a daughter of Jan Josef František Antonín, Count of Thun und Hohenstein (1711-1788) and Princess Christine of Hohenzollern-Hechingen (1715-1749).

== Biography ==
A woman of extraordinary beauty (she was nicknamed la celeste Therese), Emperor Joseph II became madly in love with her; in order to save her reputation and the position of the Dietrichstein family at court, when the Emperor was away in the Austro-Turkish War, was arranged her marriage with the Imperial Kammerherrn and General Count Philipp Joseph Kinsky von Wchinitz und Tettau (1741-1827). The wedding took place in the Imperial court at Vienna on 27 August 1787: however, the union was extremely unhappy and the groom abandoned Theresia almost immediately after. The formal separation was pronounced in 1788, but neither spouse was freed to remarry because according to the Catholic precepts they still bonded to each other.

Since 1798, Theresia became close to Maximilian, Count of Merveldt, General of Cavalry and ambassador in the Russian and English courts. Because he was a Teutonic Knight, he was unable to marry her until 1807, when Maximilian finally obtained the release of this vows; however, Theresia was still forbidden to remarry until Rome dissolved her marriage. After she declared that she had been forced to marry Count Kinsky and in a "letargic" state her maternal uncle Leopold Leonhard of Thun-Hohenstein, Bishop of Passau (who officiated at the ceremony) heard her almost imperceptible "I do", Maria Theresia was finally able to marry the Count of Merveldt.

Theresia and Maximilian of Merveldt married on 16 February 1807 in St. Petersburg, where the groom was the Imperial ambassador at that time. In jewelry and diamonds as gifts to his wife Maximillian is said to have spent more than 150,000 guilders.

After only eight years of marriage, Maximilian of Merveldt died in 1815. Theresia never remarried and died eight years later, aged 54.
