= Maximilian, Count of Merveldt =

Austrian diplomat and general (1764–1815)

Maximilian, Count von Merveldt
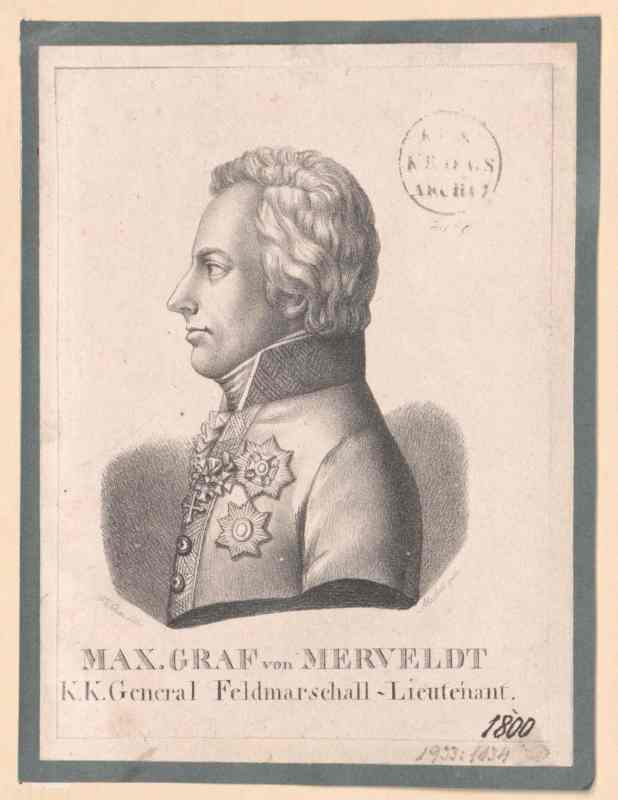
- Born: 29 June 1764; Münster, Westphalia
- Died: 5 July 1815 (aged 51) London, United Kingdom
- Allegiance: Habsburg monarchy
- Branch: Cavalry
- Service years: 1782–1814
- Rank: General of Cavalry
- Conflicts: Austro-Turkish War (1787–1791); French Revolutionary Wars; Napoleonic Wars
- Awards: Knight's Cross, Military Order of Maria Theresa; Order of Leopold
- Other work: Novice, Teutonic Order, 1790–1808. Ambassador, Second Congress of Rastatt; Ambassador, St. Petersburg; Envoy Extraordinaire, Court of St. James's

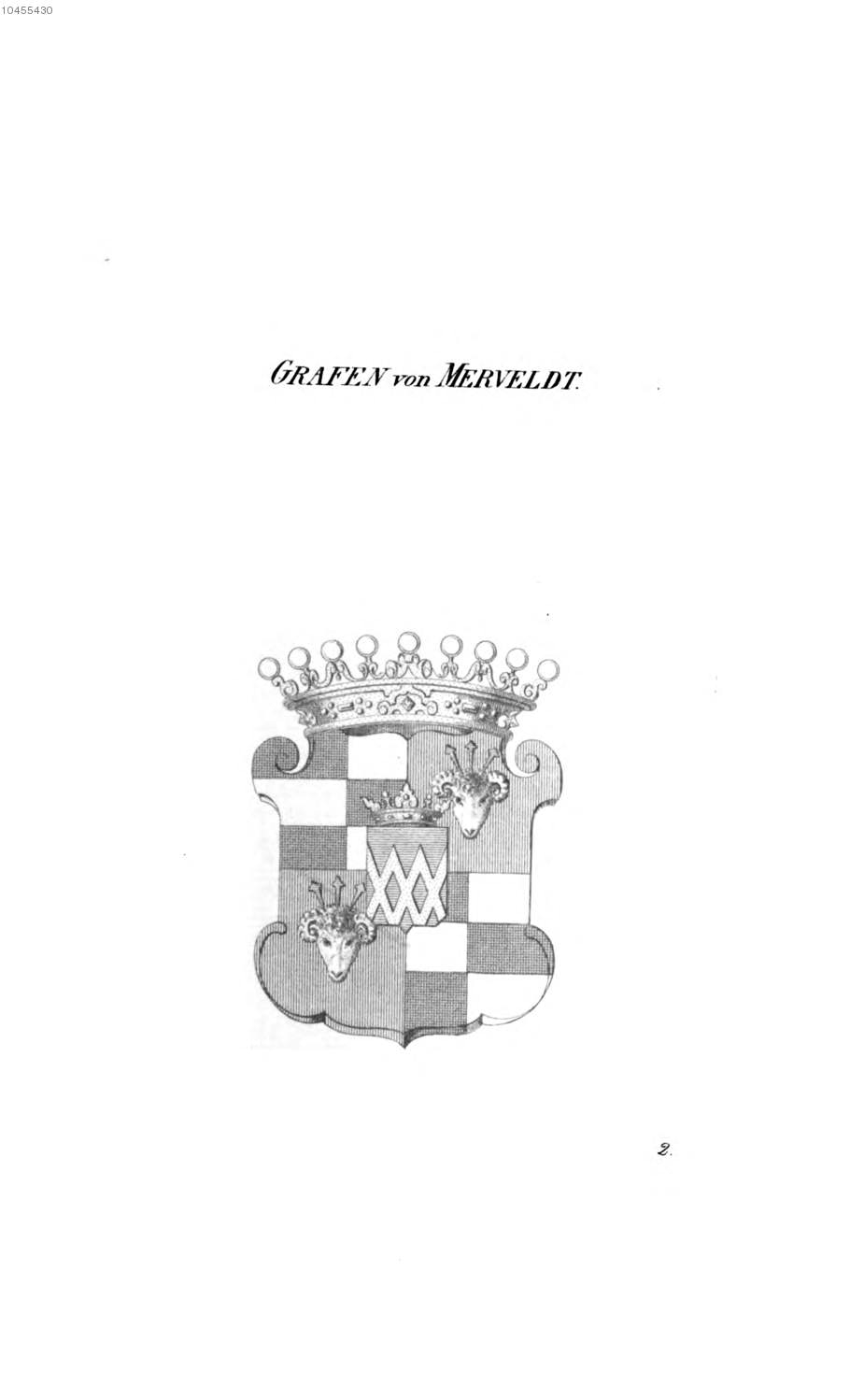
Arms of the Count von Merveldt

Maximilian, Count von Merveldt (29 June 1764 – 5 July 1815; aka Maximilian Graf von Merveldt), among the most famous of an illustrious old Westphalian family, entered Habsburg military service, rose to the rank of General of Cavalry, served as Francis II, Holy Roman Emperor's ambassador to Russia, and became special envoy extraordinaire to the Court of St. James's (Great Britain). He fought with distinction in the wars between the Habsburg and the Ottoman empires, the French Revolutionary Wars, and the Napoleonic Wars.

Maximilian entered the military as a young man, and acquired his first combat experiences the Habsburg wars with the Ottoman Empire. Following his experience in the Balkans, he retreated to the cloister at Bonn, where he spent a year as a novice in the Teutonic Order. At the outbreak of war between the Habsburg monarchy and France in 1792, he returned to military service, and proved an intrepid and enterprising cavalry field officer. His role in the Habsburg victory at Neerwinden in 1793 earned him the honor of conveying the news to the Emperor in Vienna.

In the War of the Second Coalition, Maximilian served in Swabia and northern Italy and Switzerland. In subsequent wars between France and the Habsburg Monarchy, his role on the battlefield often meant the difference between defeat and victory. He was wounded and captured at the Battle of Leipzig and, as a condition of release, he agreed not to bear arms against France again. He was subsequently appointed as an envoy to Britain, where he died in 1815.

== Family and early career ==
Maximilian was born on 29 June 1764 in the ecclesiastical territory of Münster, in Westphalia. By birth, he was a member of the House of Merveldt, an old Westphalian family, raised to comital status in 1726. He joined the military service in 1782, in a dragoon regiment, and was promoted to lieutenant and first lieutenant by 1787. In the wars between Austria and the Ottoman Empire, (1787–1791), he was a Rittmeister, or captain of cavalry and wing adjutant to Field Marshal Franz Moritz, Count von Lacy. In 1790, Merveldt commanded the Volunteers Grün-Loudon and later that year, after his promotion to major, he served on the staff of Field Marshal Ernst Gideon, Baron von Laudon in Moravia.

== Military career ==
=== War of the First Coalition ===
Following the defeat of the insurrection in the Austrian Netherlands, he received permission from Field Marshal Laudon, shortly before the latter's death, to take a one year novitiate in the Teutonic Order, at Bonn where he remained until April 1792. The outbreak of the War of the First Coalition against France required his military talents and Mervelt rejoined the Habsburg army at as adjutant to Josias, Prince of Saxe-Coburg-Saalfeld. He led two infantry battalions in the Habsburg victory at Neerwinden (18 March 1793), during which his battalions repulsed a strong French column. For his role at the head of his battalions of grenadiers, which his commander considered greater than duty required, in this victory, Merveldt received the honor of carrying the message to the Emperor Francis in Vienna. There, he was promoted to lieutenant colonel and awarded the Knight's Cross of the Military Order of Maria Theresa on 7 July 1794. Subsequently, he was appointed as an attaché to the staff of Frederick, Duke of York.

In the 1794 campaign, Merveldt fought at the Battle of Famars and again at the Battle of Villers-en-Cauchies, 15 kilometres (9 mi) south of Landrecies on 22 April, during which he commanded the right wing. At the Battle of Willems, he guided the British cavalry into a flanking position based on his knowledge of the terrain. After the Battle of Tournai (22 May 1794), he was promoted on the field to Oberst (colonel). His failing health prevented him from continued field service and he took sick leave until early 1796. In 1796 he transferred to the 18th Chevau-légers Regiment Karaczay and fought at the Battle of Kircheib, in the Westerwald, where, despite the French superiority of numbers, the Habsburgs eked out a victory. At Kircheib, with two squadrons of Chevaux-legers, Merveldt saved the Austrian artillery from French capture, thus contributing to the Habsburg victory. The Tagebericht (daily dispatch) of the Army of the Rhine referred to his keen sense of duty, and his ability to seize the moment, which, in this case, proved a vital element in the extraordinary success of the small Habsburg force against the considerably larger French one. Afterward he was promoted to major general. He was assigned as proprietor of the First Lancer's Regiment, and given command of a cavalry brigade in Franz von Werneck's Reserve of the Army of the Lower Rhine.

Merveldt was known to his contemporaries for his strength of will, presence of mind, and his self-control. Those same qualities made him attractive to his military superiors as part of the negotiation party in the cease-fire preliminaries at Leoben in 1797. He opposed Napoleon's desire to move a general peace congress closer to Vienna, and later was a co-signator of the Peace of Campo Formio on 17 November 1797. He brought the document to Rastatt, where the Rastatt Peace Congress convened. He stayed in Rastatt in the capacity of ambassador.

=== War of the Second Coalition ===
At the outbreak of the War of the Second Coalition in March 1799, and the dissolution of Congress on 7 April 1799, Merveldt returned to his regiment, which by this time had crossed the Lech and Iller rivers, and was advancing into Swabia. During the campaigns of 1800, he commanded the left wing by Eckartsweiler at the Battle of Alt-Breisach on 25 April, and on 10 May conducted a rear-guard action to protect the Imperial army's withdrawal. He remained with his brigade on the right bank of the Danube, where he directed a series of bold actions against the French, and then along the Iller and Lech rivers, he organized a series of well-timed thrusts designed to keep the French from pushing the retreating army. After the battle at Offenburg, he was promoted to Feldmarshall-Leutnant on 4 September 1800. At the Habsburg defeat in the Battle of Hohenlinden on 3 December, Merveldt commanded a division in the left wing. The division consisted of the Archduke Charles Nr. 3 and Wenzel Colloredo Nr. 56 Infantry Regiments, the Waldeck Dragoon Nr. 7 and Anspach Cuirassier Nr. 11 Regiments for a total of 4,204 infantry and 1,799 cavalry.

He signed the 24-hour cease-fire at Kremsmünster with Jean Victor Moreau on 22 December. During the cease-fire, he retreated to Pressburg.

== Diplomatic and military career during the Napoleonic Wars ==
=== Napoleonic Wars ===
In 1805 he was in Berlin when the hostilities between France and Austria resumed, and he returned to the Danube valley, where he fought a series of rearguard actions. He avoided being caught in the capitulation of Ulm and fell back toward Mikhail Kutuzov's Russian army. With 6,000 soldiers in six line and ten Grenz infantry battalions plus 14 squadrons of cavalry, Merveldt made for Styria, hoping to join the army of Archduke Charles. Napoleon detached Louis Davout's III Corps in pursuit. Slowed by heavy snow in the mountains, his "poorly-handled corps" was overtaken by the French. At Gross-Ramig, also called Mariazell, in the Austrian Steiermark, on 8 November 1805, his exhausted troops were routed by General of Brigade Etienne Heudelet de Bierre's advanced guard of Louis-Nicolas Davout's III Corps; half, about 2,000, were taken prisoner, and they lost four colors and 16 guns.

Promotions

- Major: 14 February 1790
- Lt. Colonel: 03 April 1793
- Colonel : 26 April 1794
- Major General: 8 September 1796 (effective 10 September 1796)
- Lt. Field Marshal 4 September 1800 (effective 5 September 1800)
- General of Cavalry: 22 July 1813

After the War of the Third Coalition, he acted as ambassador to St. Petersburg for over two years, with the assignment of improving military relations between the armies of the respective countries. He attempted to do this, including trying an offer to mediate between Britain and France, and was appointed Privy Councilor. During this time, he married Countess Maria Theresia von Dietrichstein, member of the powerful House of Dietrichstein, who was previously divorced from Count Philip Joseph, Count Kinsky von Wchinitz und Tettau (1741–1827).

In 1808 he was given command of a cavalry division in Lemberg. In early 1809, Merveldt became a prominent member of the group pushing for war against France, together with such notables as Archduke Ferdinand, Archduke John, Empress Maria Ludovika of Austria-Este, and Count Heinrich von Bellegarde. In the 1809 campaign, Merveldt's force was stationed in the Bukowina and part of Galicia, and from 1809 to mid-1813, he spent three years in Moravia.

On 22 July 1813 he was appointed governor of the fortress of Theresienstadt and shortly after that Commanding General in Moravia and Silesia. He then became commander of II Corps; the First Division held the village of Nollendorf, in the French defeat at the Battle of Kulm (now Chlumec) on 29–30 August 1813.

On 16 October, during the Battle of Leipzig, Merveldt's forces were arrayed on the right flank of the French center, commanded by Napoleon. On his own right stood Wittgenstein's Corps, and beyond that, Johann von Klenau's. His troops were interspersed among several wooded sections and surrounding several small villages: Dölitz, Mark-Kleeburg and Gautsch. Opposite him were the forces of Józef Antoni Poniatowski and Pierre Augereau. He rode out to view the battlefield and to direct the disposition of his force. Near Dölitz, which lay close to the French line, he wandered into a troop of Hungarians, or so he thought, but they were actually a mixed group of Saxons and Poles, whom he mistook for Hungarians, and was captured. Most of the action, on the first day, occurred to the north, where Blücher's Prussians repelled Michel Ney's cavalry, but when Napoleon heard that Ney and Marmont had been forced back, he sought a cease-fire from the Allied monarchs. He called for Merveldt, and, after a meeting, Merveldt carried Napoleon's proposal to the allied monarchs, which they refused.

=== Final diplomatic missions ===
As a condition of his release at Leipzig, he agreed not to participate in combat against France. Subsequent to his release, Merveldt was appointed commanding general of Moravia, and lived in Brno, where he received in January 1814 the instructions to proceed to London as an envoy extraordinaire to the Court of St. James's, replacing Baron Wessembourg. He arrived in London in early March, and met the Prince Regent at Carlton House on 7 March 1814, where he ceremoniously presented his ambassadorial credentials. He was well-received in Britain, and became a notable personage, invited to many social events; he told good stories about the wars and the various people he had encountered, which made him popular in social circles. His comings and goings were widely reported in the society columns: For example, on 4 July 1814, he attended a lecture by the Abbé Secard, and was listed among the distinguished persons present. When he died in 1815, the British government proposed to bury him at Westminster Abbey. However, his widow took into account his last wishes and had the remains sent to Germany. He was buried in the crypt of the Michaelis Chapel in Lembeck Castle where his grave still exists.

In 1903, in the Lößnig neighborhood of the city of Leipzig a square and a street were named after Maximilian von Merveldt, in honor of his contribution to the Battle of Leipzig. In 1950, the communist authorities of East Germany renamed Merveldt Square to Rembrandt Square and Merveldt Street to Rembrandt Street.
