= Lembeck Castle =

Moated castle in the urban area of Dorsten, Germany

Coordinates: 51°44′36″N 6°59′57″E

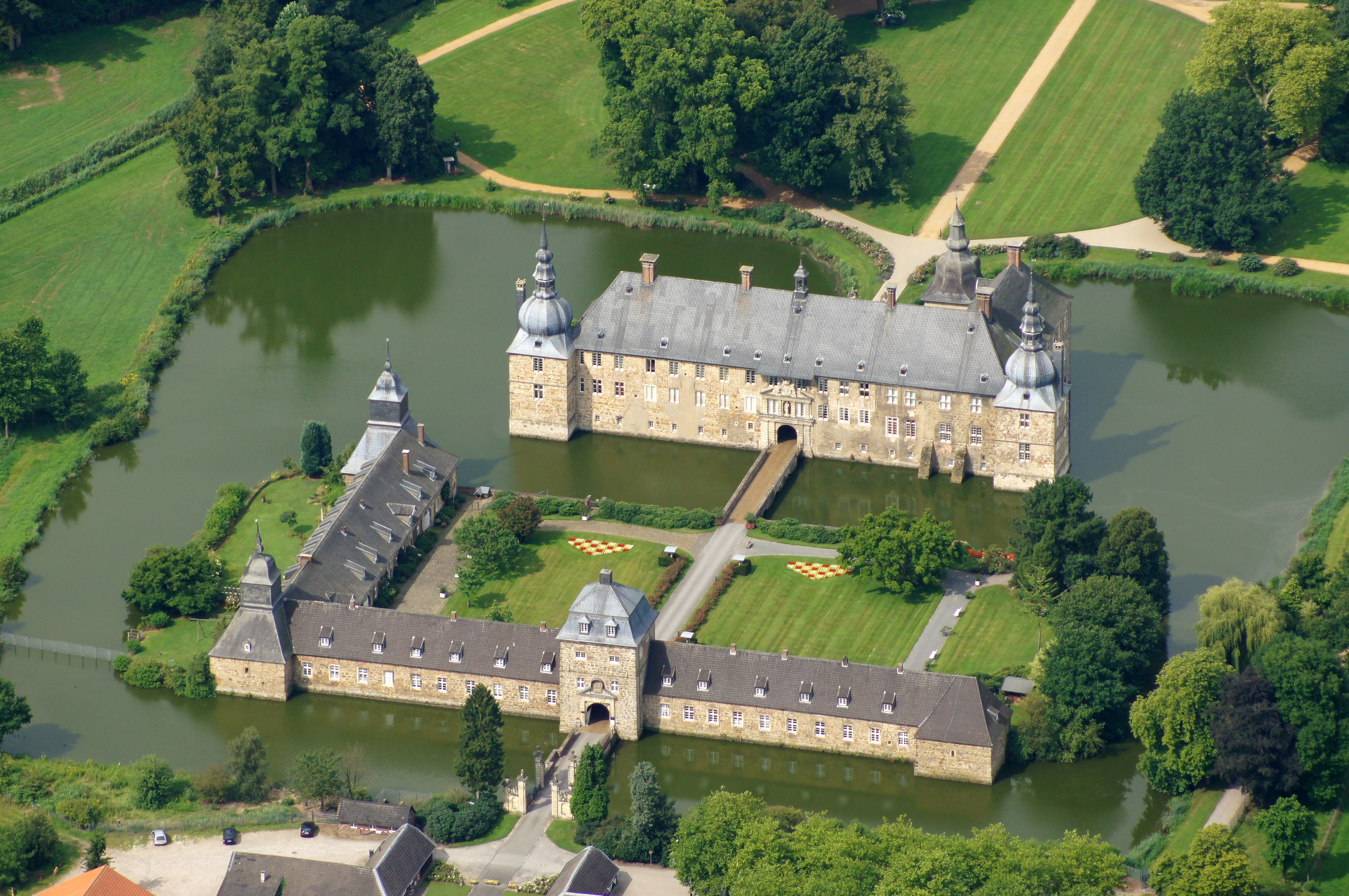
Aerial view of the main and outer baileys

Lembeck Castle (German: Schloss Lembeck), located in the urban area of Dorsten on the border of the northern Ruhr region and the southern Münsterland, is a moated castle. It is located in the Hohe Mark Nature Park and surrounded by the "Hagen" and "Kippheide" forests to the south of the Dorsten district of Lembeck in the northwest of the Recklinghausen region.

The name "Lembeck" for the castle is derived from Low German. The root word "beke" signifies "flowing water" or "brook". The determiner indicates “slimy” and is related to "loam" and "glue" linguistically. Consequently, Lembeck can be translated as Lehmbach, indicating its previous location in a swamp and bog region.

== Description ==
=== Building ===
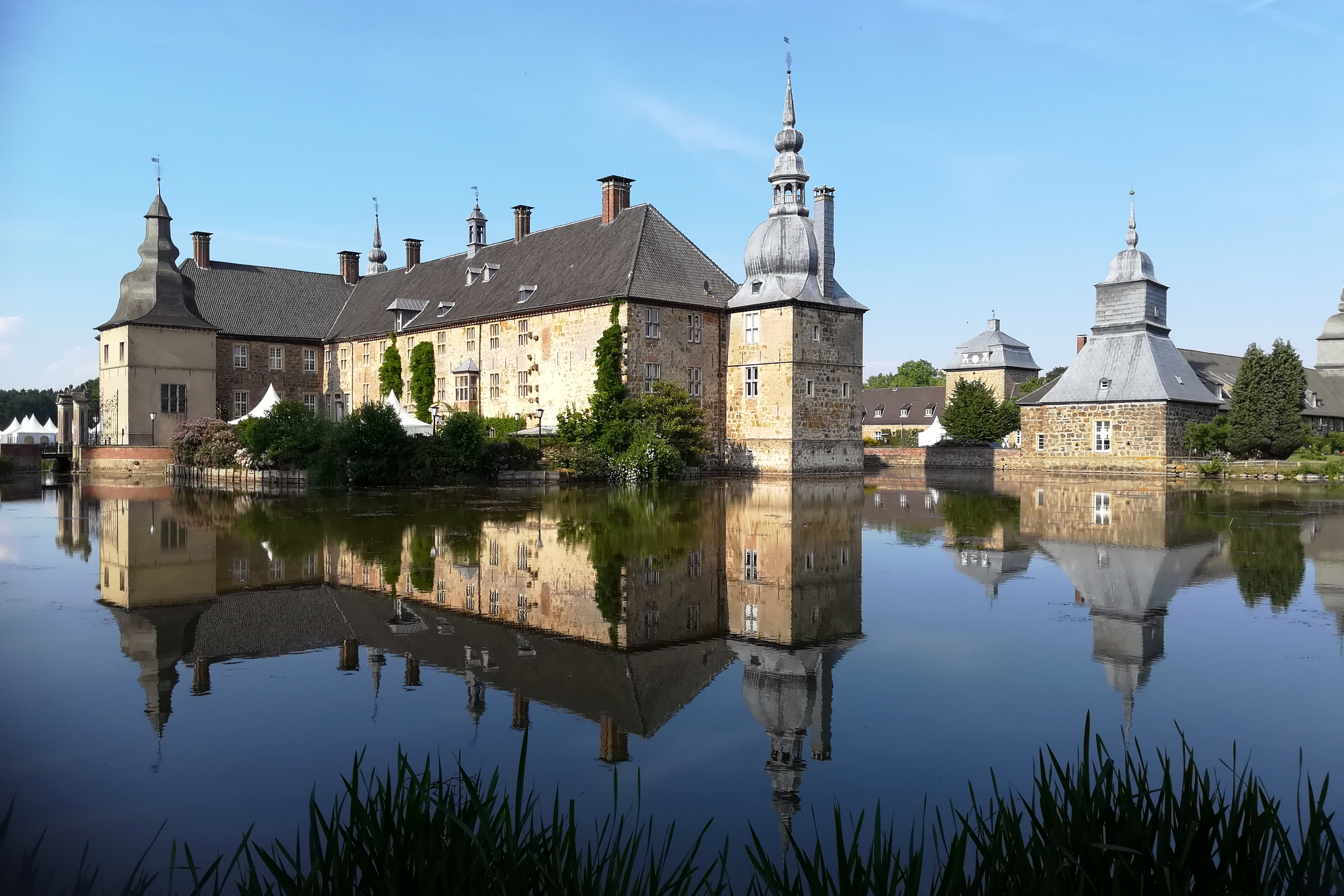
Southwest view of the main house

The Lembeck meadow stream has been dammed on the castle grounds to form a rectangular pond that spans an area of 190 × 160 meters, encircling the entire complex. As a result, the various parts of the castle are situated on an island that is interconnected by bridges.

The Baroque palace complex exhibits a symmetrical structure, defined by a rectilinear east-west axis that extends for a length of 500 meters. The axis begins with a 200-meter-long avenue from the east that leads to the former three-winged outer bailey.

==== Outer bailey ====
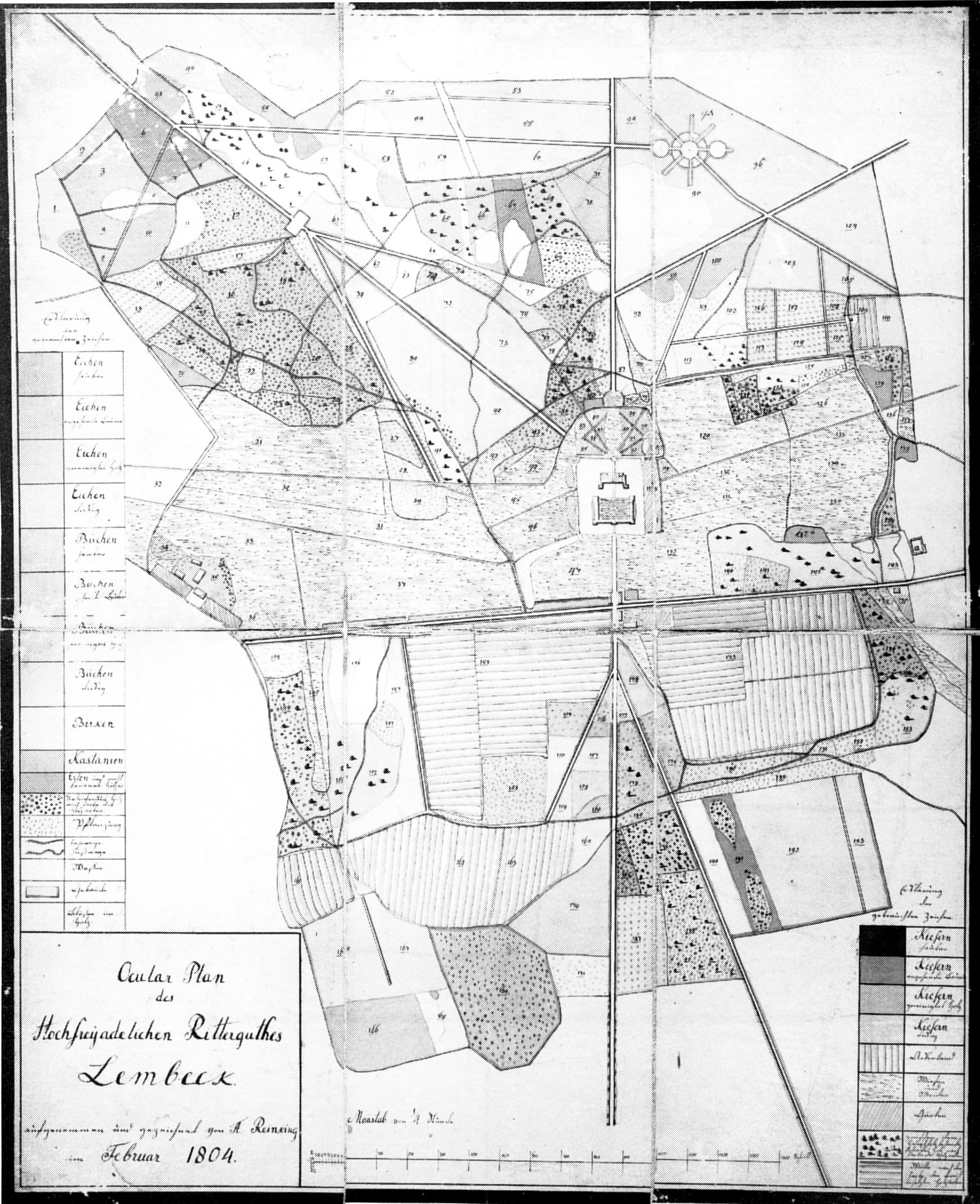
Map of the surroundings of the castle, 1804

The outer bailey comprises two wings and a one-story façade 110 meters wide, interrupted by a two-story gatehouse made of ashlar sandstone. Access to the outer bailey is granted through two consecutive bridges. It is currently covered with a basic mansard roof. Above the gateway is a keystone displaying the coats of arms of Dietrich Conrad Adolf von Westerholt zu Lembeck and his wife Marie Theodora von Waldbott-Bassenheim-Gudenau, along with the year 1692, signifying the completion of the outer castle rebuilding.

At its ends, the southern wing of the outer bailey is bordered by single-story corner towers adorned with Welsh hoods and imperial shaft ends. These towers feature keyholes in the basement. Additionally, the southeast tower, as well as the towers situated to the left and right of the gatehouse, also possess embrasures.

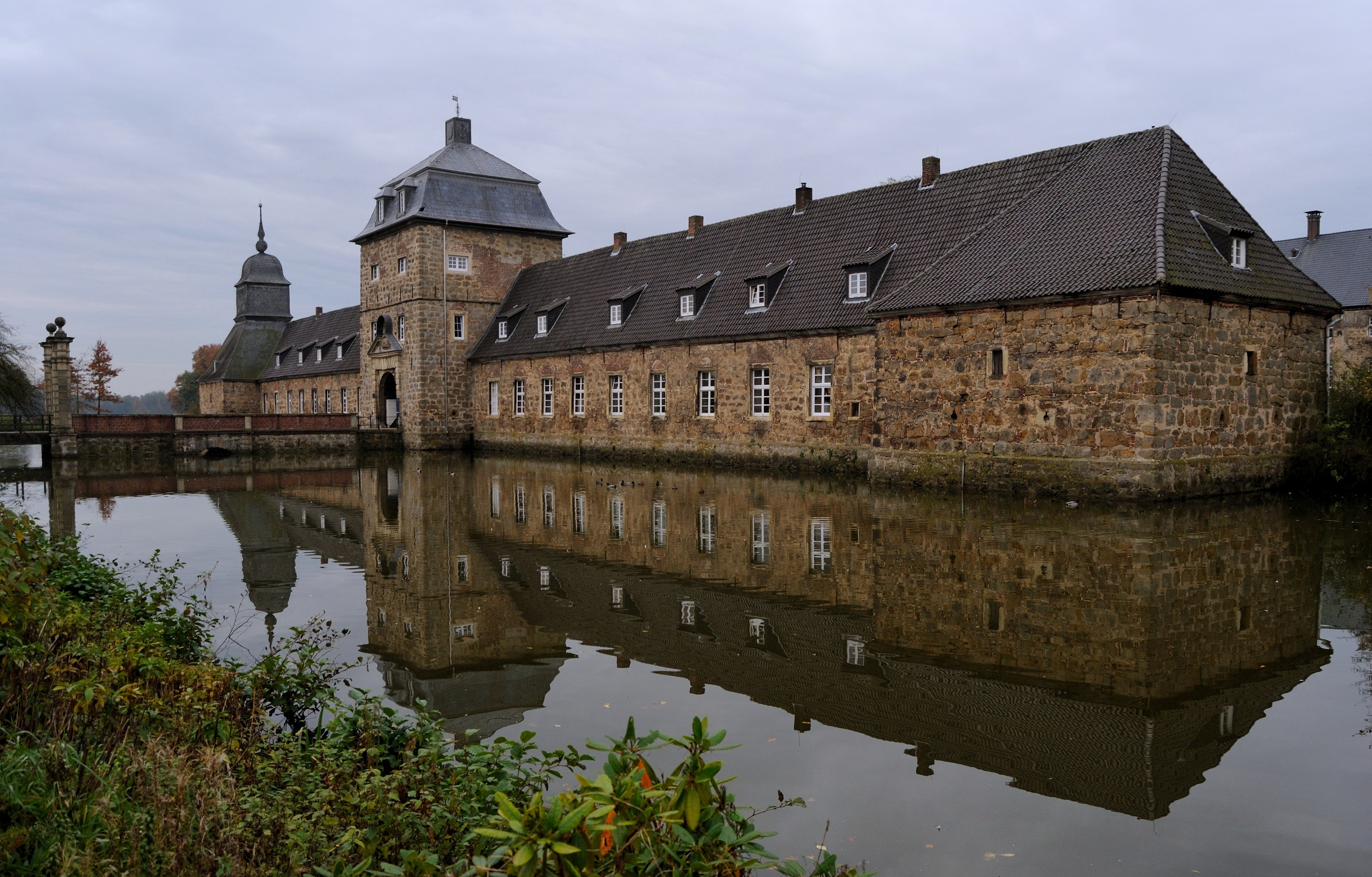
View of the bailey from the northeast

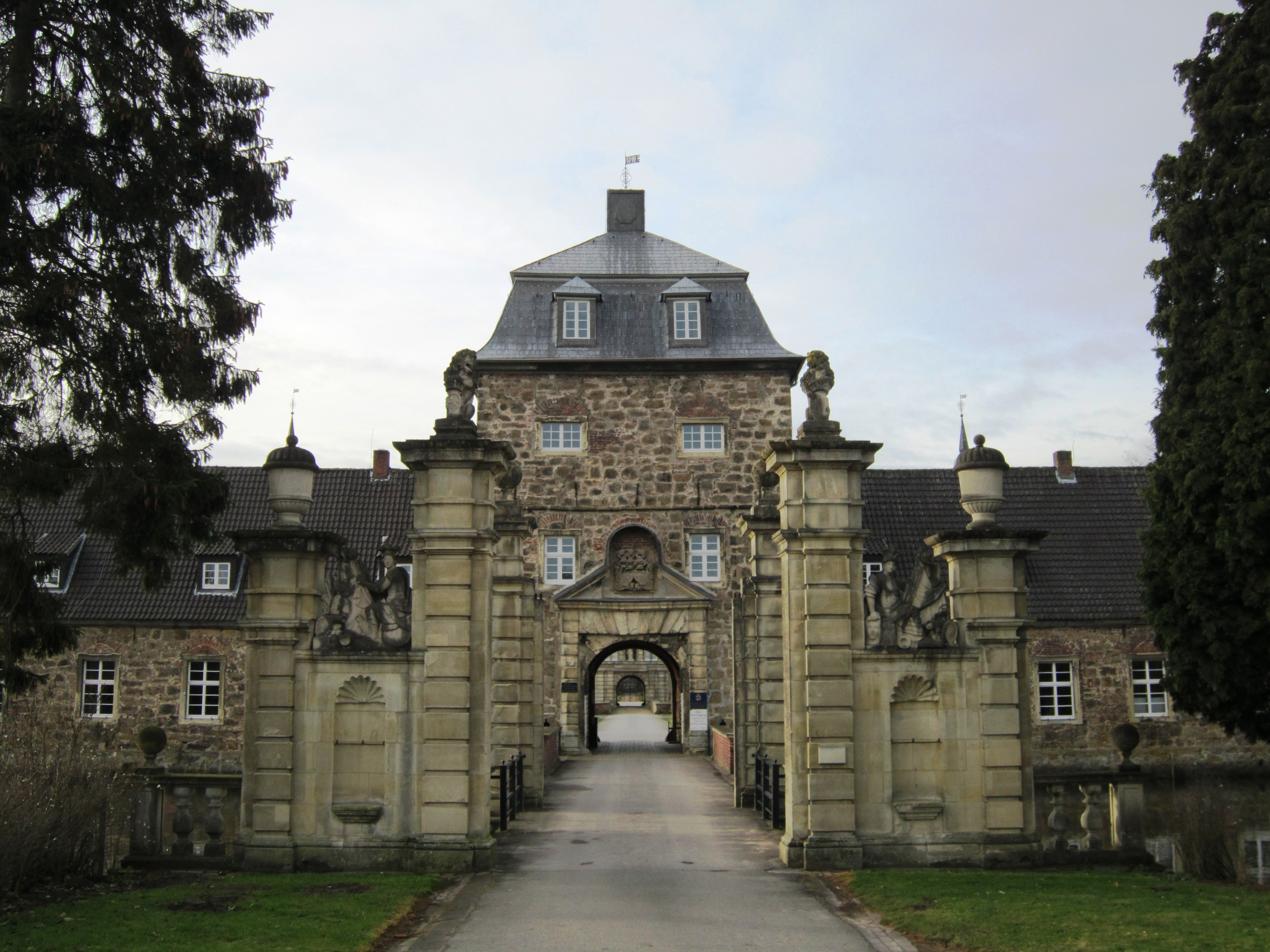
Portal and gatehouse of the bailey

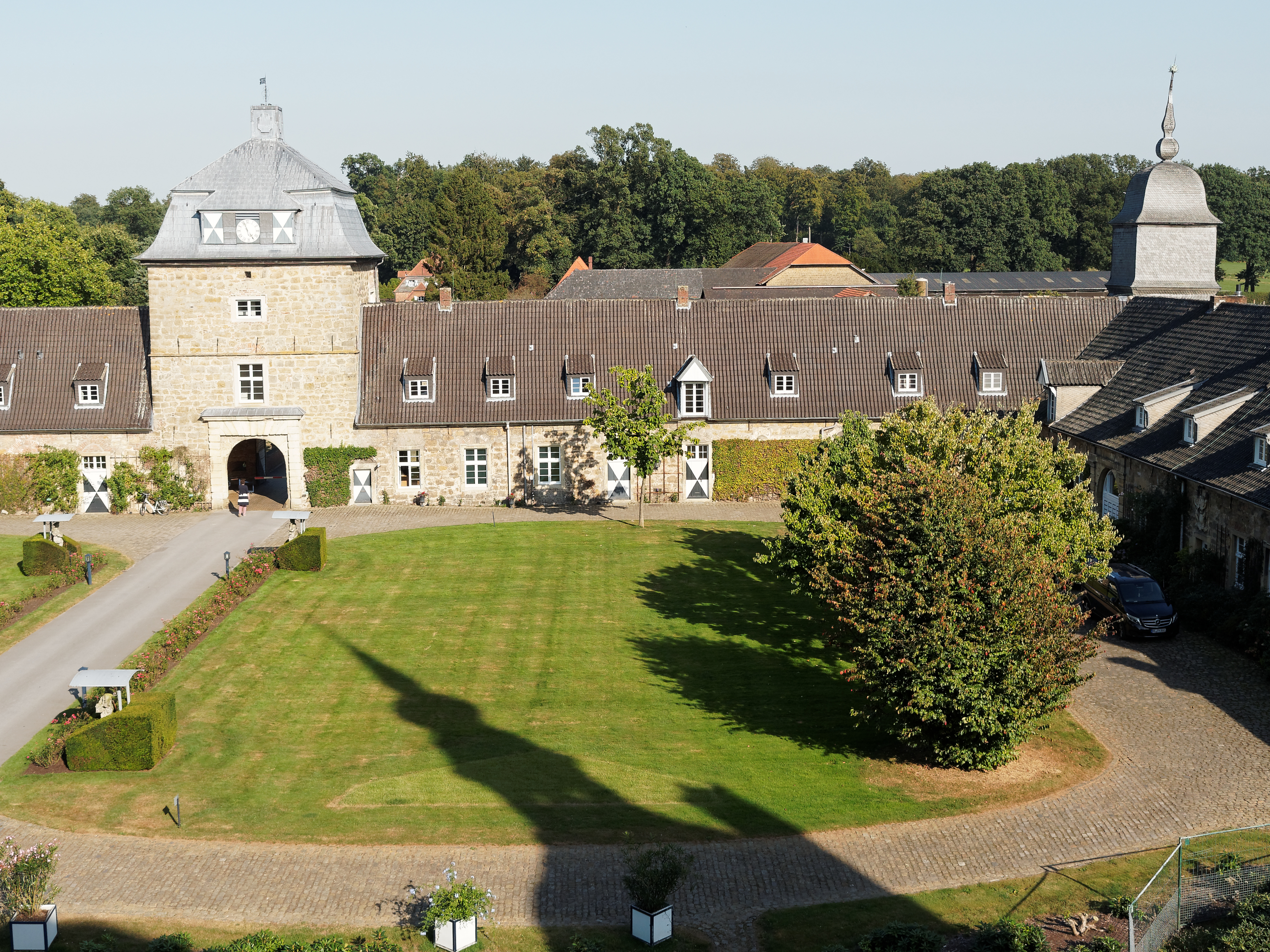
View of the courtyard of the outer bailey

==== Manor house ====
Access to the three-story manor house is through the outer courtyard and across a stone-arched bridge. Although initially intended as a three-winged structure, it is believed that financial constraints led to its execution as a two-winged building. Notably, the manor house was originally decorated with a plaster finish featuring incised ashlars, rather than painted ashlars as previously assumed.

The east wing, consisting of two pavilion towers, measures 94 meters in length and was fully finished in 1679. On the other hand, the earlier northern wing was incorporated into the reconstruction efforts between 1674 and 1679.

The sandstone portal above the entrance is a more intricate design than the outer castle. Its elevation, reaching up to the base of the roof, gives it the appearance of a central risalit. The portal showcases the coat of arms representing the alliance between Burchardt von Westerholt zu Lembeck and his wife Clara von der Recke. Behind the portal is a passage inspired by Italian Renaissance and Mannerism architecture. Similar passage halls can be found in renowned structures such as the Palazzo Pitti and Palazzo Strozzi in Florence, as well as the Palazzo Farnese in Rome. This design element allowed arriving guests to enter the building without getting wet during rainy weather, while their carriages were either turned or parked in the courtyard.

From the courtyard of the mansion, there is a broad sandstone staircase consisting of 14 steps. This staircase leads to a 19th-century terrace, which provides access to the present entrance portal.

On the side facing the inner courtyard, the façade of the mansion features a Renaissance bay window supported by double curved sandstone consoles. The front of the bay window is divided by six windows, and some of these windows bear marked glass panes with dates, providing insights into the construction period of the building. The latest date found on the glass panes is 1677, offering a valuable clue regarding its historical timeline.

All the corner towers of the manor house have Welsh hoods and pear-shaped embrasures in their bases.

To the west, a wooden bridge connects the mansion island to the park. The brick bridge piers are adorned with yellowish Baumberg sandstone and crowned by putti holding coats of arms. These piers, designed by Johann Conrad Schlaun in 1728, were built after 1730. The putties are depicted holding the coats of arms belonging to Ferdinand von Merveldt and Maria von Westerholt-Lembeck.

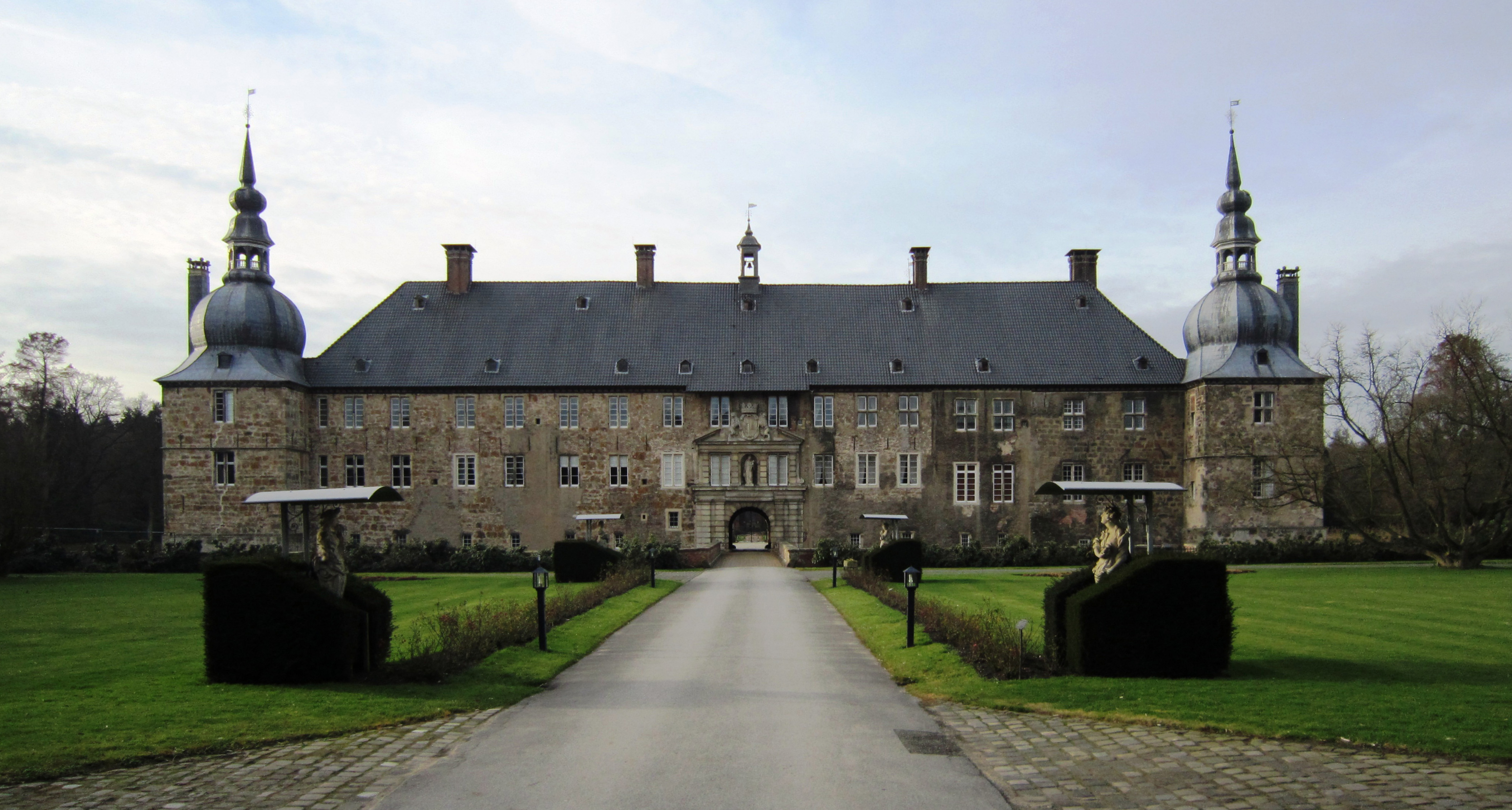
Main house, east side

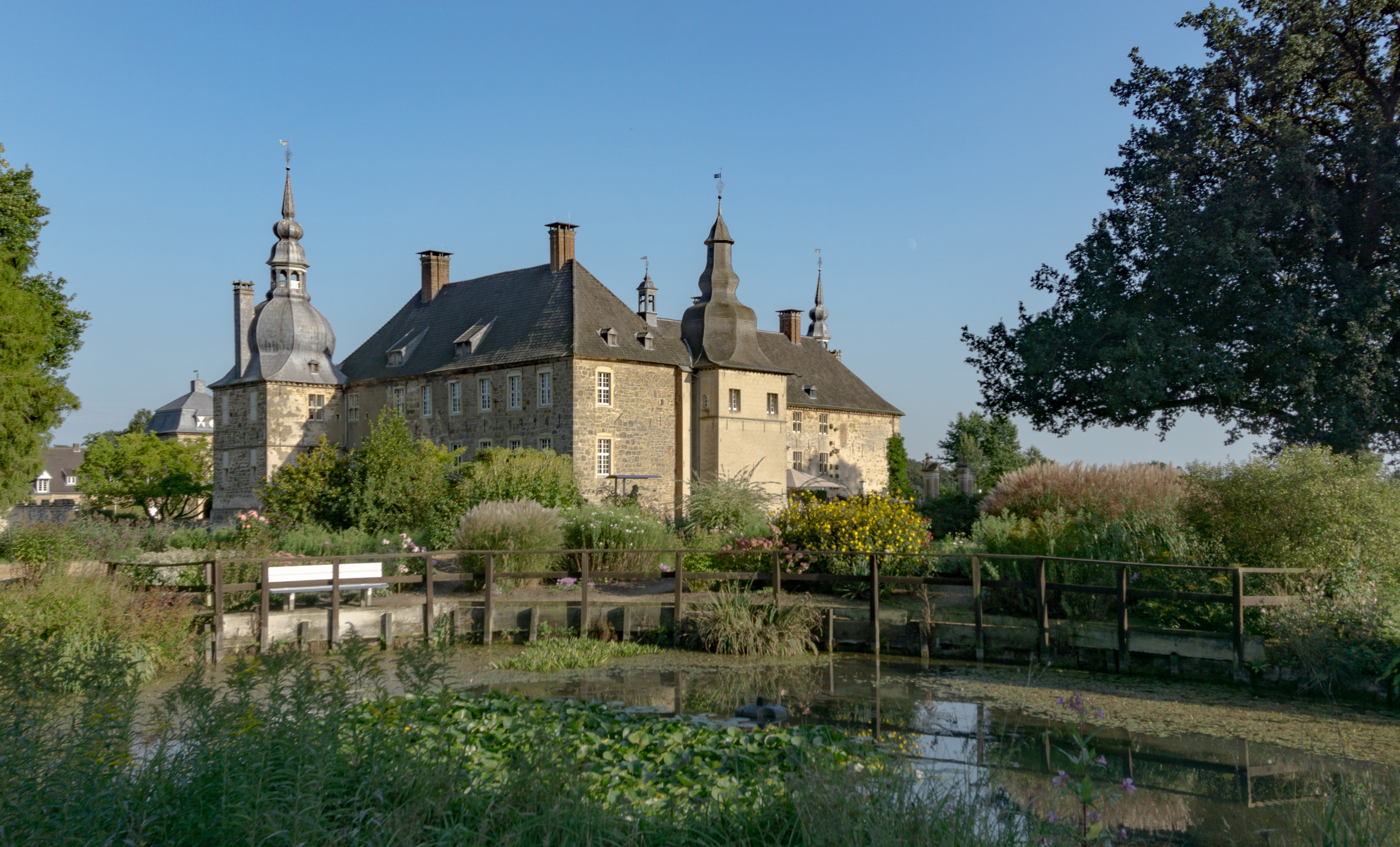
Northwest view of the main house

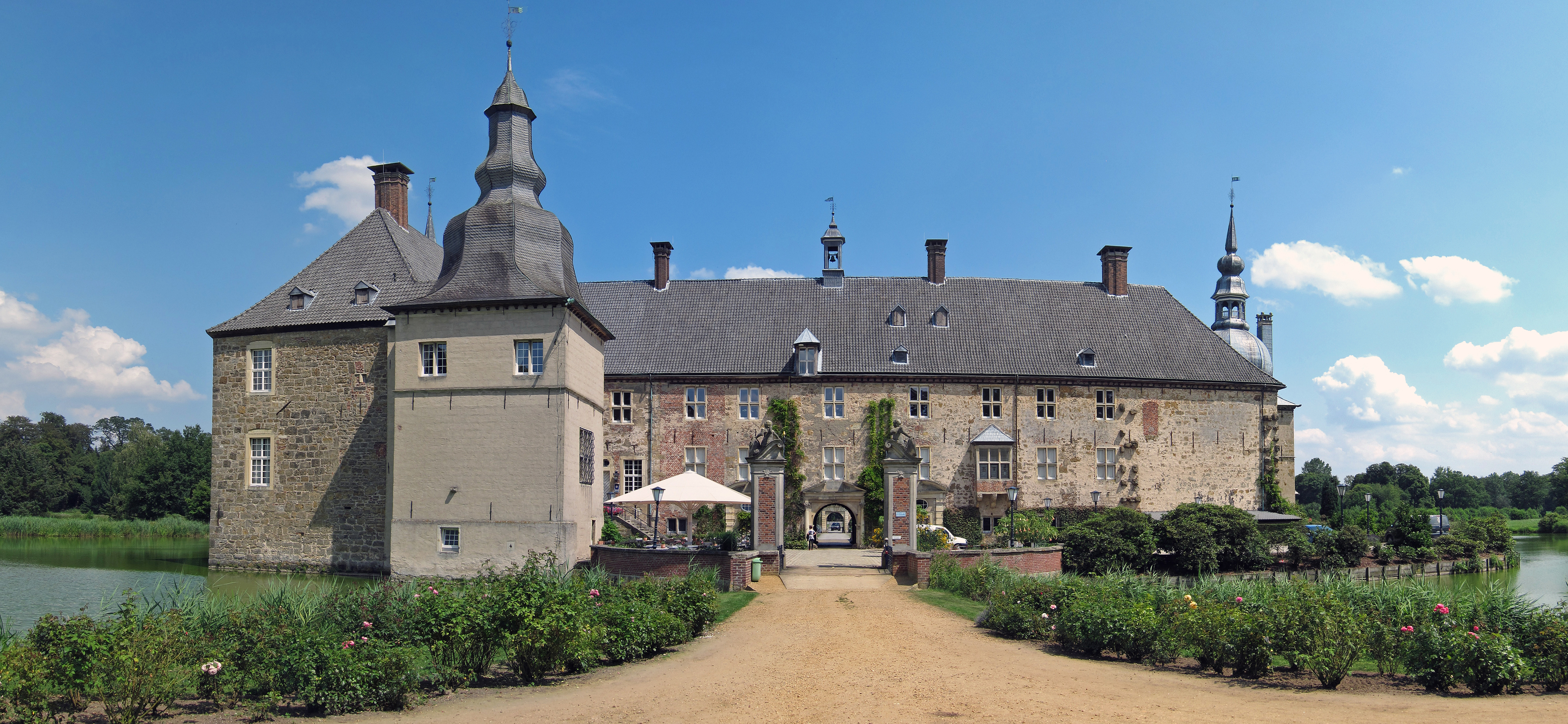
main house, west side; in the foreground the chapel tower

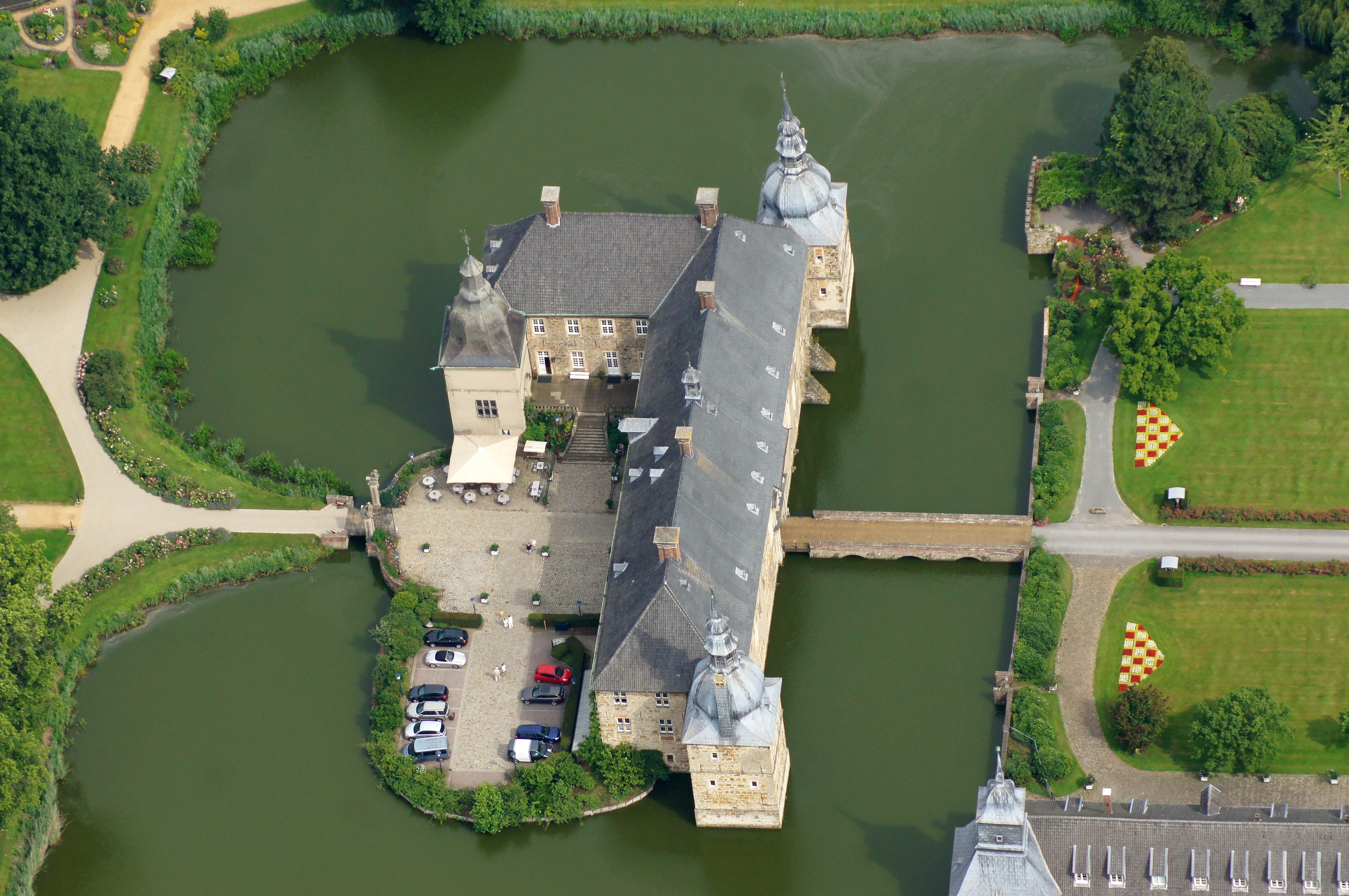
Aerial view of the main house

==== Chapel Tower ====
Situated at the northwest corner of the manor house, the chapel tower showcases a neo-Gothic architectural style. It has undergone numerous alterations throughout its history. The portal on the tower’s eastern side, which dates from the late 17th century, reflects its original design. Its cellar was previously used as a prison, while later it functioned as a wine cellar for the castle's restaurant. The former cross vault of the tower was demolished in 1737.

The tower derived its name from the chapel, which has been documented there since 1737. However, historical records indicate that the chapel was initially mentioned in 1363 when it was located in the hall chamber house. Based on the documents that are currently available, the notion that the chapel was relocated from the hall chamber house to the tower in 1692 is unsubstantiated.

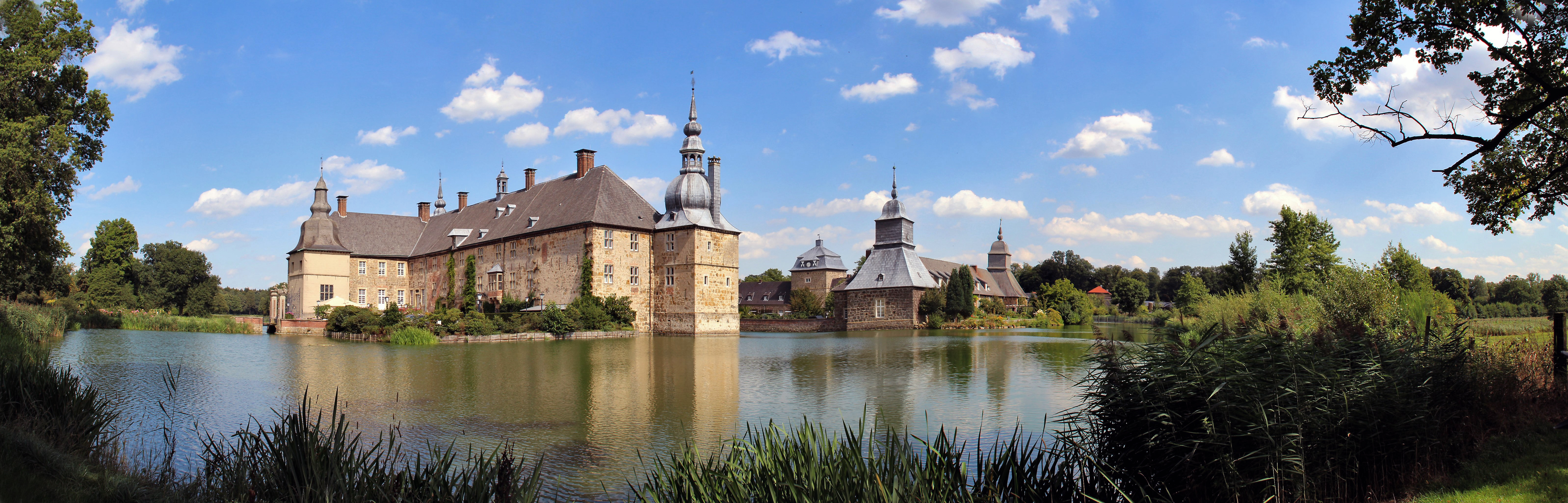
Moated castle in Dorsten (Recklinghausen district)

=== Interiors of the manor house on the mezzanine floor ===
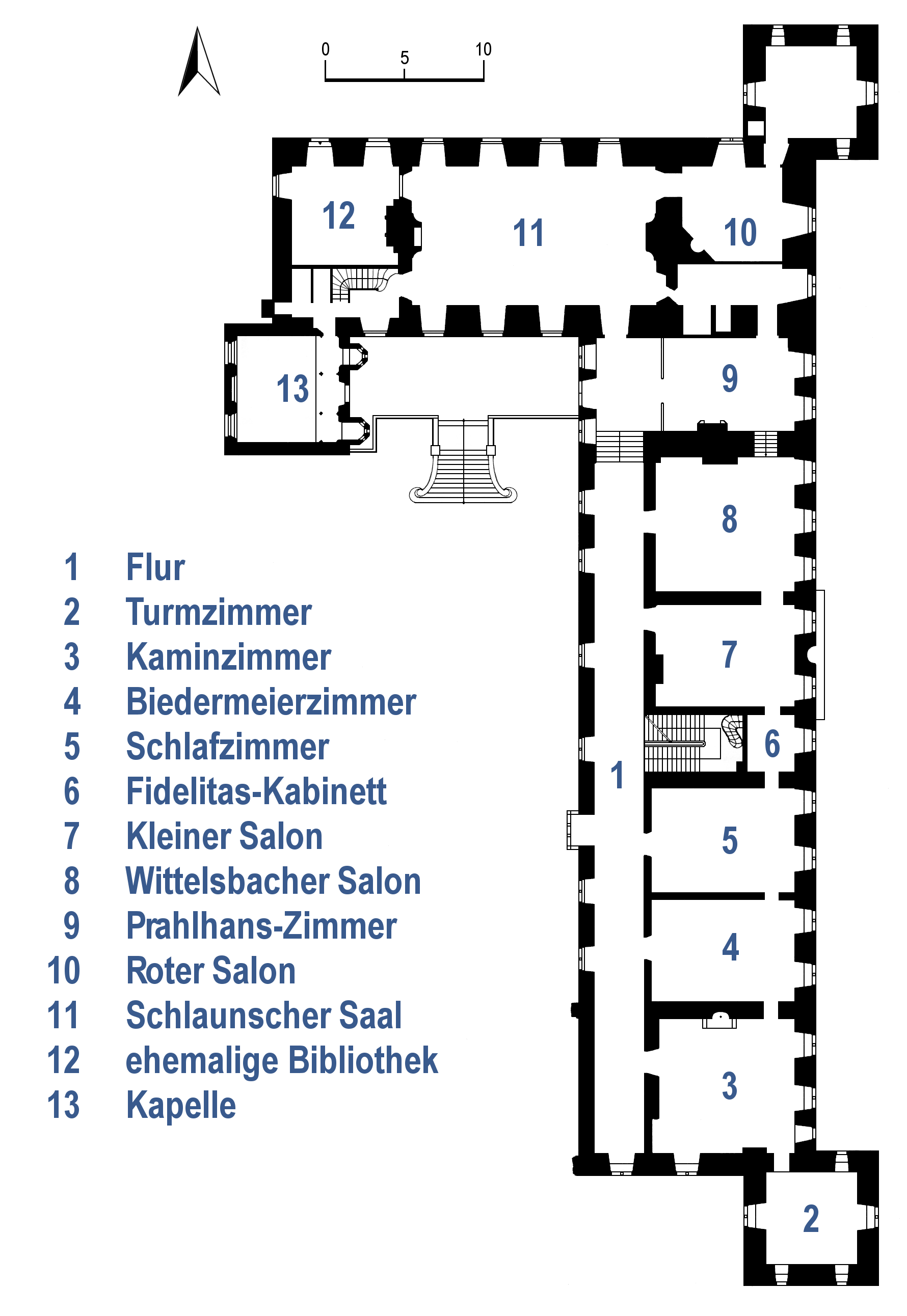
Ground floor

Unlike other Baroque castles, the interior layout of Lembeck does not follow the typical hierarchical arrangement of rooms centered around a central hall. This can be attributed to the limitations imposed by the existing building structure during the construction work in the last quarter of the 17th century. Instead, the interior design adopts the cabinet system in Enfilade, which features a series of interconnected rooms following French models. It is worth noting that this design choice was already falling out of fashion in France during the time of construction. Despite following the Enfilade style, the alignment of the room passages does not strictly adhere to a straight line.

With the exception of the Fidelitas Cabinet, the small salon, the small hall, and all the other rooms in Lembeck Castle are decorated with a dark, coffered oak lambris. This type of paneling is characteristic of early Baroque design and adds a distinct aesthetic to the interior design of the rooms.

==== Corridor ====
The 45-meter-long hallway on the courtyard side is flanked by five adjoining rooms. Five enormous tapestries from a Flemish workshop originating from the 17th century are displayed along the eastern walls of the hallway. These tapestries depict scenes from the saga of Odysseus and Iphigenia. Additionally, there is a coat of arms cartouche from the late 17th century, showcasing the alliance coat of arms of the Westerholt and von der Recke families. The corridor is finished with a variety of ceramics from the Netherlands and Asia.

==== Tower room ====
The room in the south tower of Lembeck Castle occupies the entire space with a floor plan of 5.75 × 5.75 meters. It stands out as the sole living room in the castle that contains a substantial cross-ribbed vault. The lower sections of its walls, along with the areas between the windows, feature panels crafted from fragments of the Rococo and Empire periods. On the south wall of the room, there is a fireplace from 1563, the location of which was originally the burned-down north wing of the outer castle.

==== Fireplace room ====
The fireplace room features a beamed ceiling, which was only uncovered in 1960/61 under a stucco ceiling and still has remains of the original 17th-century painting. The room derives its name from the fireplace, crafted from Baumberg sandstone, which showcases elaborate Renaissance-style decorations. Attached to the fireplace is a coat of arms that signifies the familial connections to the von Raesfeld and von Bronckhorst families, who resided in Anholt Castle. According to a floor plan from 1779, two dressing rooms were positioned on the south side of the chamber, indicating its previous function as a parade bedroom.

==== Biedermeier room ====
The room got its name only in the recent past due to the style of its interior. It is otherwise plain and has no architectural decoration.

==== Bedroom ====
The bedroom in Lembeck Castle has a remarkable architectural feature in the form of a grand, classicist stucco rosette adorning its ceiling. The room is furnished with a late Gothic wardrobe from around 1500 and a four-poster bed with a canopy bearing an alliance coat of arms of the von Raesfeld and von Recke families.

==== Fidelitas Cabinet ====
The Fidelitas Cabinet derived its name from an oil painting on its ceiling, depicting an allegorical representation of Fidelitas. This is the only remaining original wall painting at Lembeck Castle. The room's distinctive feature is the white color of its oak lambris, setting it apart from others. Delicate pastel-shaded stucco frames small oval oil paintings, likely portraits of the daughters of Dietrich Conrad von Westerholt and his wife Maria Theodora von Waldbott-Bassenheim-Gudenau. Despite its compact size, measuring only 10.6 m^{2}, the Fidelitas Cabinet underwent a comprehensive restoration in 1972, preserving its unique historical character.

==== Small drawing room ====
The room located above the passage hall has wainscoting and white-painted doors. Its walls are covered with Chinois wallpapers from the 18th century. The oak parquet floor remains in its original form, showcasing the enduring beauty of this classic flooring choice. A cylindrical stove made of cast iron replaced the previous fireplace in the 18th century, reflecting the changing trends in heating technology during that time. This transition to a new type of heating system aligns with the evolving fashion and functionality of the era.

==== Small Hall (Wittelsbach Salon) ====
The small hall, the sole room on the mezzanine level, contains three windows that allow ample natural light to fill the space. Its stucco ceiling is adorned with delicate pastel shades. The parquet floor showcases intricate inlaid patterns, displaying exquisite craftsmanship. In the focal point of the room, a Rococo and Régence red marble fireplace is engraved with the initials of the castle's inhabitants at the time, Clemens August von Merveldt and his wife Marie Antoinette, formerly Countess von Wolff-Metternich. A portrait of Cologne's Prince-Bishop Clemens August dominates the wall above the fireplace. On the west wall hangs a portrait of Goswin von Merveldt, Grand Prior of the Order of Malta for Germany and Imperial Prince at Heitersheim. Supraports above the doors show portraits of Westerholt's daughters.

The room is furnished with white and gold-framed seating furniture in the rococo style, the covers of which are made of Gobelin embroidery. They come from the Merveldter Hof in Münster, which was destroyed by bombs in 1941.

==== Bragging room ====
The Bragging Room, situated at the northern end of the main wing, is the mansion's oldest part. Although it is lower in elevation than the other rooms, it shares the same level as Schlaun's Hall. It has a rich stucco decoration, some of which is even more brilliantly executed than in the large banqueting hall. The stucco work dates back to approximately 1730/40. The room features a black marble fireplace, which was added later, specifically after 1779. Its placement is distinct, deliberately positioned away from the back of the fireplace in the adjacent tiny hall.

==== North wing ====
===== Former dining room (Red Salon) =====
The former dining room has the thickest wall in the wing, with a thickness of 2.30 meters in the east. A wall divides the rectangular room into a hall-like passage of 2.55 × 6.35 meters and an almost square cabinet with a floor plan of 5.90 × 6.35 meters. The former dining room with its classicist stuccowork from the end of the 18th century owes its nickname Red Salon due to its wall covering of red silk damask.

===== Large ballroom =====
Designed by the renowned architect Johann Conrad Schlaun, the grand banqueting hall exemplifies the late Baroque style. It is the largest room in the palace, spanning 140 m^{2} and embracing the entire width of the north wing. The hall features a total of six entrances, with four positioned on the east and west walls. The fifth entrance, which serves as the main entrance, is located in the southeast corner, while the sixth entrance discreetly hides behind the middle window of the three terrace-facing south windows from 1738. These windows are symmetrically complemented by corresponding windows on the north wall. Above each doorway, supraports adorn the space, depicting picturesque scenes from country life.

At the center of each of the two front sides of the hall is a black marble fireplace, which was installed there before 1738. Above each hangs a mirror, that accompanies the portraits of the then owners Ferdinand Dietrich von Merveldt and his wife Maria Josepha Anna Theodora Gabriele, née von Westerholt. Another eleven portrait paintings, depicting the children of the lords of the castle as well as their respective spouses, and the portrait of an unknown person hang on the wall surfaces covered with green silk damask, the lower half of which is paneled with coffered oak lambris. The expensive wall covering was renewed in 1954, based on old photographs, following its theft in 1946 by military personnel stationed in the castle.

The beautiful stuccowork on the ceiling, which probably dates from the period 1730 to 1733, is the banquet hall's most distinctive feature. They show great similarities with the stuccowork of the yellow apartment in Augustusburg Palace and in the rooms of Nordkirchen Palace, which were also designed by Schlaun. Due to water damage caused by the ravages of war, the stuccowork suffered significant deterioration. It was restored in both 1954 and 1973, and today it showcases a delicate palette of pastel shades, encompassing gentle tones of green, yellow, and pink.

===== Former library =====
The library of the palace was once located in the cabinet to the west of Schlaun's Hall. The room, measuring 6.40 6 m2, was almost completely demolished at its northwest corner by a bomb hit during WWII and was never rebuilt "to its former glory." It is currently the only chamber in the palace without a wall panel. In the room hang portraits of members of the von Merveldt and von Galen families and a painting depicting the death of Richard the Lionheart, which is attributed to the Nazarene school.

===== Chapel Tower =====
The chapel has a neo-Gothic interior. The state gallery is located on the east side and is supported by two free-standing pillars. Red-brown, blue, and gold ornaments decorate the coffered stucco ceiling.

=== Parking facility ===
After reconstruction work from 1674 to 1692, a baroque garden based on the French model with symmetrical path axes was laid out to the west of the castle according to designs by August Reinking. An 1804 survey of Lembeck’s landscape shows how the "all-pervading" east-west axis of the complex ended in the wooded area of the "Hagen".

Today, hardly anything can be seen of the eastern installations. Only a few overgrown aisles in the forest testify to the fact that this part was once part of the design concept.

In the 19th century, under Ferdinand-Anton von Merveldt, the park was redesigned according to the taste of the time into an English landscape garden.

== History ==
=== Owners and residents ===
Adolf von Lembeck, also known as "von Lehembeke," is mentioned in historical records dating back to 1177 as a knight and ministeriale of the Bishopric of Münster. His family, known as the Lords of Lembeck, held jurisdiction over the Lembeck estate. From 1390 onwards, the castle became an open residence for the Bishop of Münster.

In 1526, with the death of Johann von Lembeck, the male line of the Lembeck family came to an end. The property then passed to Berta, Johann's daughter, who was married to Bernhard I von Westerholt in 1515. Through this marriage, the Westphalian noble family established the line known as "von Westerholt zu Lembeck." In 1536, Bernhard I officially received the lordship through enfeoffment by the Bishop of Münster, Franz von Waldeck. Bernhard held a position as the bishop's confidant and commanded the bishop's cavalry. He was involved in the committee responsible for expelling the Anabaptists from Münster and assisted the bishop during his escape from the Anabaptist movement to Dülmen in 1534. Upon Bernhard I's death on 26 August 1554 his son Bernhard II took over the leadership of the family estate as the lord mayor and continued the tradition of maintaining strong ties with Münster.

In 1576, the outbreak of the Eighty Years' War had significant repercussions on Lembeck Castle and its lordship. Despite the best efforts of Bernhard II and his son Matthias, who succeeded him as lord mayor, the region suffered greatly due to the war's events. However, Matthias von Lembeck maintained a high reputation among the local nobility. Alongside the lords of Velen, von Galen, and von Raesfeld, he successfully prevented the occupation of Münster Abbey by Spanish troops. Furthermore, starting in 1607, Matthia began negotiations with the Spaniards, ensuring that the monastery would no longer be subjected to harassment by their forces. Matthias made the decision to transfer control of the dominion to his brother Johann while still alive due to his declining health.

The Lords of Lembeck faced considerable debts due to the significant impact of the Eighty Years' War. Johann was compelled to sell the castle complex in 1631 to his relative Bernhard von Westerholt zu Hackfort, who belonged to the Dutch branch of the family. Bernhard, as the Lords of Lembeck’s major creditor, had accumulated claims amounting to 111,000 Reichstaler, which could not be settled through any other means.

During the Thirty Years' War, Bernhard von Westerholt zu Hackfort fought on the side of the Catholic League rising to the rank of colonel in the imperial army. The castle and manor remained unaffected by the war until 1631-1632, but then it also broke over Lembeck. However, this news did not reach the newly crowned baron at his castle in Lembeck, because he had to flee from the troops of Landgrave Wilhelm V. of Hesse-Kassel to a family estate in Haselünne. In his place, General Peter Melander von Holzappel resided there since 16 February 1633. Under the martial law prevailing at the time, Melander claimed the castle as his headquarters, leading to Bernhard's forced dispossession. Bernhard, living in "exile," died on 19 November 1638.

In 1641, Bernhard's eldest son, Burckhardt Wilhelm, successfully regained ownership of Lembeck Castle for the family. His son, Dietrich Conrad Adolf, was granted the hereditary title of an imperial count in 1700. Under his stewardship, the castle underwent extensive expansion and reconstruction between 1670 and 1692, transforming it into one of the largest moated castles in the Münsterland region. However, when Dietrich Conrad Adolf died in 1702 without any male heirs, the castle was inherited by his daughter, Maria Josepha Anna. In 1708, Maria Josepha Anna married Ferdinand Dietrich Freiherr von Merveldt zu Westerwinkel, a member of the Wolbeck Drosten family, who was later elevated to the rank of Reichsgraf (Imperial Count) in 1726. The castle has remained in the possession of the von Merveldt family to this day. The current owners of the estate are Ferdinand Count von Merveldt and his wife Catharine.

=== Building History ===
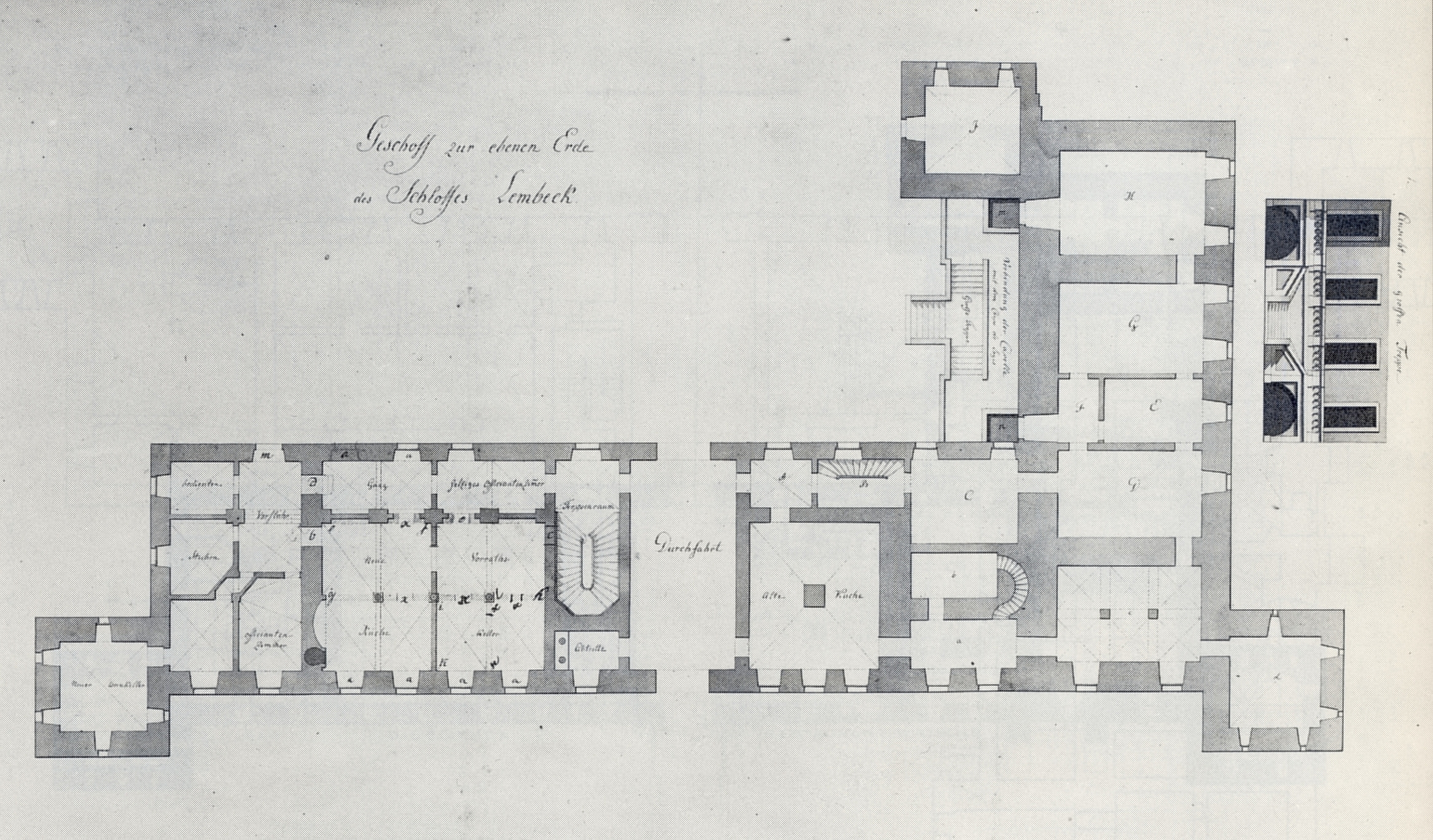
Ground plan of the mansion basement, 1819

A fortified estate, the so-called "Oberhof in der Lehmbecke", is already mentioned in documents from the 12th century. It was located somewhat away from the villages of Lembeck and Wulfen at that time and was administered and inhabited by the Lords of Lembeck on behalf of the Bishop of Münster.

The Lords of Lembeck built a tower hill castle as their new family seat on the current site of Lembeck Castle, which is first documented in the 14th century. It stood in the middle of swamp and water and was extended to the north at this time by an annex with two rooms known as a "two-chamber house". Further expansions took place in the 15th century, including the addition of an extension and a corner tower known as the "chapel tower."

Around 1490, the land ownership of both houses existing at that time was merged. The old castle was subsequently demolished.

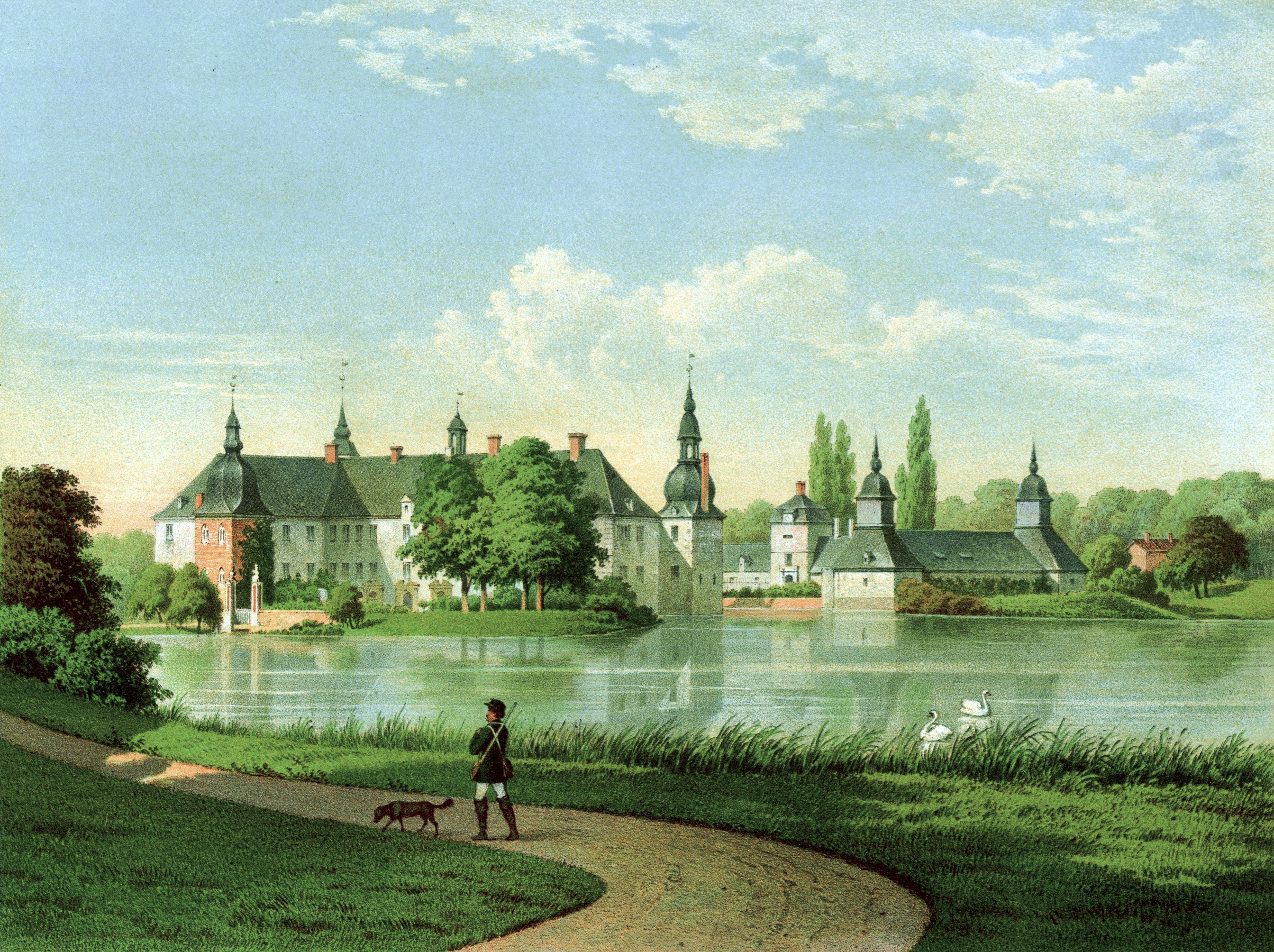
Lembeck Castle around 1865, Alexander Duncker Collection

Lembeck Castle underwent a significant transformation and obtained its current form under the supervision of Dietrich Conrad Adolf von Westerholt-Lembeck. Between 1674 and 1692, he spearheaded an expansion and reconstruction project in the Baroque style. The identity of the master builder responsible for the construction remains unknown. While a surveyor's certificate from 1674 mentions a "Master Emond," it is uncertain whether this refers to the master builder or solely a master mason involved in the project. The reconstruction efforts commenced with the renovation and extension of the old three-chambered house in 1674. Subsequently, a wing was added to the south of the existing structure, a construction endeavor that reached completion in 1679.

The exterior castle was rebuilt in 1692. The distinct construction phases of these structures may still be apparent from the different floor heights and clearly visible construction joints. The latter was attempted to be covered with plaster but is no longer preserved. The gatehouse was given its current mansard roof in 1741. It was previously crowned by a Welsh dome, as were all of the castle complex's towers.

The Münster architect Johann Conrad Schlaun played a significant role in the subsequent reconstruction work during the 18th century. He is honored by the splendid Schlaun Hall in the north wing of the main structure, which features late Baroque furnishings created by him. Along with its comprehensive redesign, a Renaissance oriel on the north façade of the wing was demolished.

The chapel tower was completely renovated between 1831 and 1833 after it was discovered to be deteriorating in 1829. Documents from the building time indicate that the work was not merely renovation, but rather a nearly total destruction and reconstruction.

The north wing of the outer bailey, which contained stables, burned down with both corner towers in 1887 and was never restored. However, the date of the fire could be incorrect, because there is a note in the file from 1889 that suggests a fire that year: "One of the four corner towers of the outer castle was incinerated by the carelessness of the Russians."

During WWII, castle Lembeck suffered significant damage in 1943 as a result of bombings and vandalism by occupying forces. The owners at the time, Maria-Josefa Freifrau von Twickel, née Countess von Merveldt, and her husband Johannes, opened it to the public in 1954 after its renovation, which architect Franz Schneider began in 1947 and his son Paul Schneider-Esleben initially continued in 1948.

As a result, the south wing of the outer bailey was converted for residential purposes in 1958, while the castle owners needed quieter accommodation. Previously, the outer bailey was only utilized as a tool shed and stables, with a distillery established in the southwest tower in the 19th century.

In the 1960s and 1970s, the State Office for the Preservation of Historical Monuments carried out several restoration and renovation efforts at Lembeck Castle. Schlaun's bridge piers to the garden, for example, were rebuilt in 1969, and in 1977, a grey plaster was added to the red bricks of the chapel tower to imitate previous times. In 1965, following renovation work, a hotel was opened on the upper floor of the manor house, and a restaurant in the vaulted cellar.

The four basic construction phases of the manor house of Lembeck Castle can be read off very well today from the wall thicknesses of the existing building stock: the thicker the wall, the greater its age. The preserved parts of the Lords of Lembeck's original residential tower or hall chamber house in the north wing have a thickness of up to 2.30 meters. The preserved walls, with the exception of the west side of the Bragging room and the north and south walls of the Schlaun ballroom, date from the second construction phase (1.90-2.10 m). The third building phase can be defined as the addition of the southern wing and the three corner towers: The wing's façade walls are 1.10-1.30 m thick, while the corner towers' walls are 1.40-1.70 m thick. The chapel tower's low wall thickness in comparison to the other two corner towers can be explained by its probable reconstruction beginning in 1831.

=== Today's usage ===
==== Building ====
Until the end of 2016, a section of the castle was operated as a hotel and restaurant. Currently, the castle serves various purposes. It has a castle museum on the mezzanine floor of the main building, which is open to guided visits. The museum showcases the owners’ 300 years old collection of art, including Chinese porcelain, Flemish tapestries, paintings, and furniture from the Rococo and Empire/Biedermeier periods.

The attic of the main house is home to the local history museum, operated by the Lembeck Local History Society since 1992. The museum is open on Saturday and Sunday afternoons. It exhibits handicraft and agricultural tools, as well as everyday objects from the past, giving visitors a glimpse into bygone times. Additionally, archaeological finds are also on display at the museum.

The basement of the main house, which used to be the castle kitchen, now serves as a gallery exhibiting paintings by Hanns Hubertus Graf von Merveldt. The baroque atmosphere of the space is also utilized for civil weddings. Furthermore, certain rooms in the castle are available for private rentals. The Schlaun Hall is suitable for hosting celebrations and events, while the castle chapel can be used for weddings or baptisms.

Every year, the castle grounds host two major events that draw in over 20,000 visitors. In late spring, the four-day country party takes place, offering a variety of activities and attractions. Later in the summer, the castle grounds host a fine arts market with artworks and crafts. Additionally, the castle's ballroom frequently hosts concerts for attendees to enjoy.

==== Park area ====
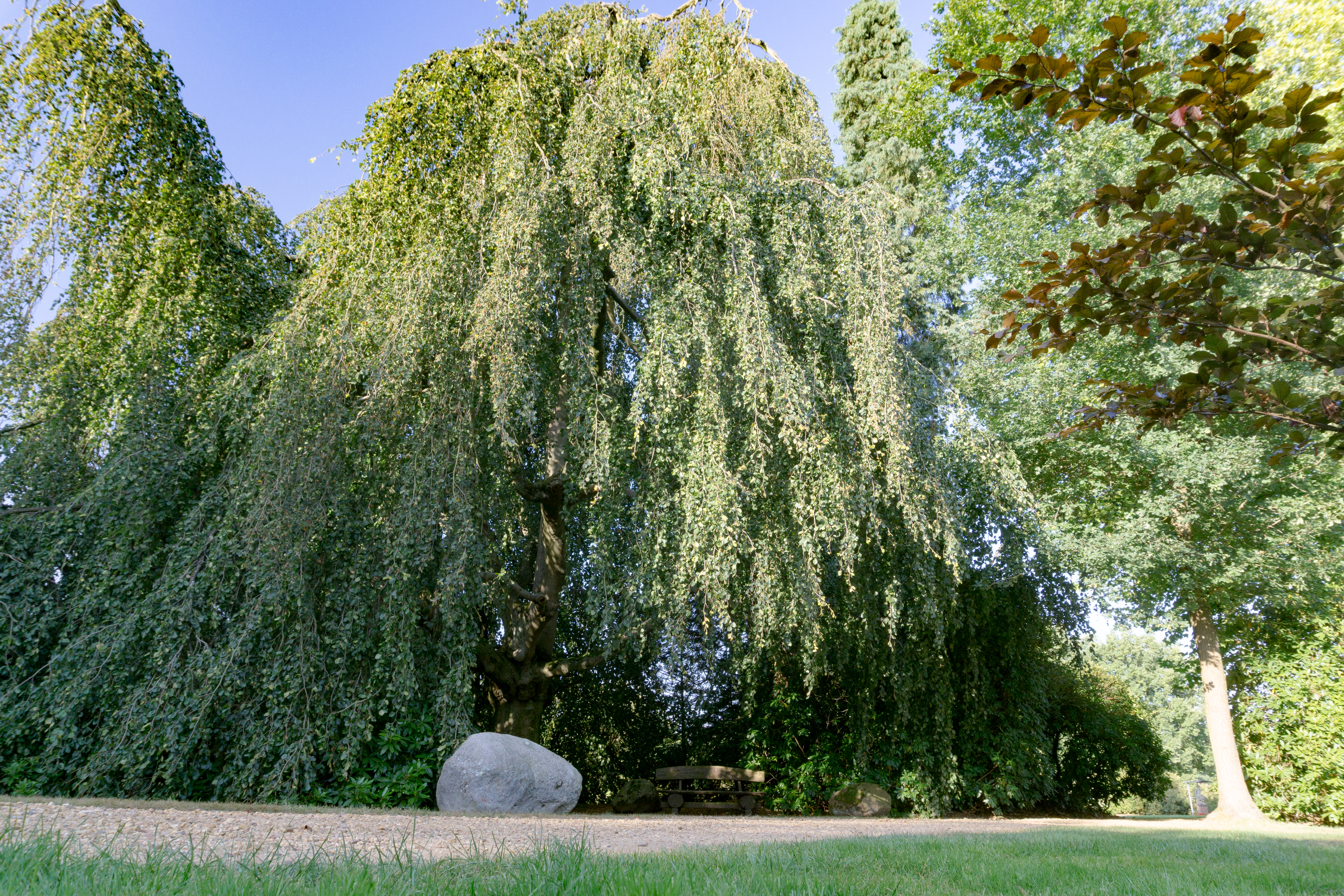
Part of the palace park

As the number of castle visitors increased, the previous private garden of the castle owners gradually evolved into an excursion destination for the entire family.

In 1960, Heinrich Nottelmann, the head of the castle nursery at the time, initiated the cultivation of rhododendrons at Lembeck Castle. By 1967, a dedicated area of four hectares adjacent to the park was developed into a rhododendron garden. This garden, known today as Heinrich-Nottelmann-Park, features 150 different rhododendron species and 70 other tree species. It is especially captivating during the rhododendron bloom, which takes place from mid-May to mid-June.

In addition to the gardens, there is a playground and a petting zoo on the park's grounds that amuse the younger guests, while the older ones can relax at the rentable barbecue area.
