= Merveldt family =

German aristocratic family of Westphalia

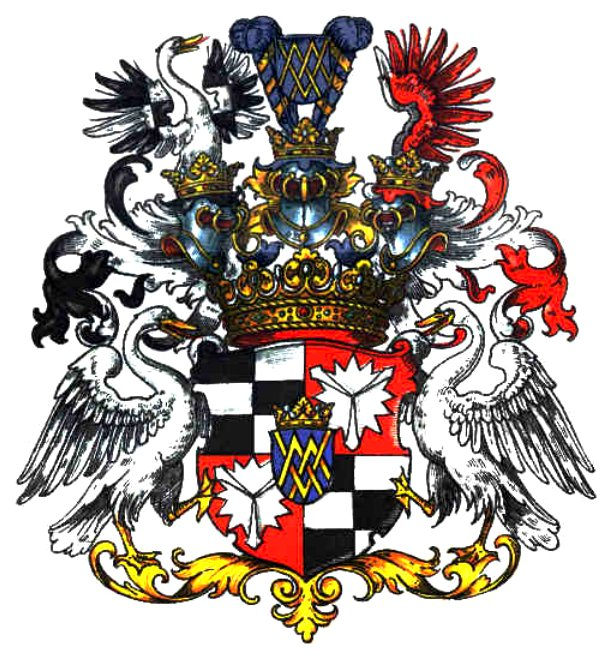
Coat of arms of the Grafen [Counts] von Merveldt

The House of Merveldt (also Meerveldt or Merfeld) is the name of an ancient Westphalian aristocratic family, which belongs to the German nobility of the Middle Ages. The Herrn (Lords) von Merveldt were among the oldest families in the Münsterland. Merfeld, the eponymous seat of the family, is now a neighborhood of the city of Dülmen in the District of Coesfeld in the state of North Rhine-Westphalia in Germany.

== History ==
=== Origin ===
The first documented member of the family was in 1169, when the Ministerialis Henricus de Merevelde appeared in documents. The reliable line of descent began with 1227, the date mentioned in documents with “ministerialis beati Pauli” [Latin, “Ministrialis of St. Paul’s”], the office of Hermannus de Mervelde, Ministerial of the Prince-Bishops of Munster. Bernd and Hermann von Merveldt mentioned in documents from 1251, were Burgmannen [castle defenders] of Dülmen for the Prince-Bishops of Münster.

=== Development ===
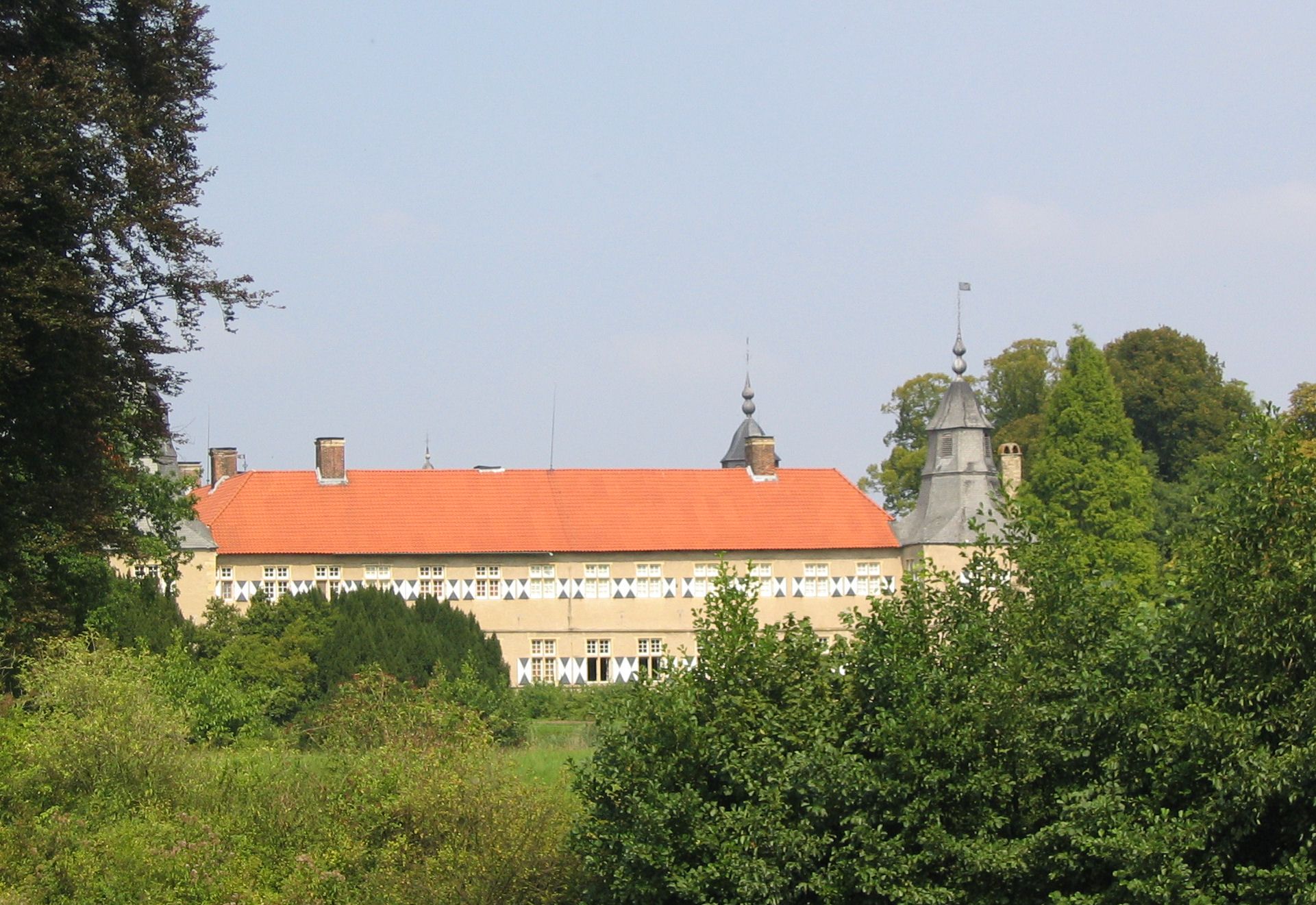
Schloss Westerwinkel, built in the second half of the 17th century, one of the earliest Baroque castles in Westphalia

The grandson of the progenitor Hermann founded three lines. The first of them was derived from Johannes, the Ritter [knight] and Schenk [butler] of the Bishop of Münster and who later called himself only Schenk, and was established until 1400 in Dülmen. Hermann, the Burgmann of Stromberg, the second line, which became extinct in 1691 (based on the eponymous family seat, Merfeld). The third and still flourishing line began with Heinrich, the knight and, like his brother, Burgmann of Stromberg (later a resident at Schloss Westerwinkel). A branch of this line was later also established in Courland (now western Latvia).

Numerous members of the family remained in the service of the Prince-Bishops of Münster and were canons in the Münster Cathedral. Later, they also appeared in the cathedral chapters of Hildesheim, Osnabrück and Paderborn. In St. Mauritz (now in the east side of Münster) and Xanten they were canons. Female members of the family performed as canonesses in Kanonissenstift (secular nunnery) Überwasser in Münster, Borghorst and the St. Boniface Frauenstift (secular nunnery) in Freckenhorst.

Bishop Heidenreich of Münster granted Marshal Heinrich von Merveldt in 1389 the manor of Wolbeck (now in the southeastern part of Münster). There, the Herrn von Merveldt held the office of Drosten (bailiffs) until the Secularization. The goal of an independent Imperial estate was not achieved because of the disputes within the family and of the encroachments of the episcopal lords. With his efforts as the moderator, Hermann von Merveldt Hermann participated in the completion of the Treaty of Kranenburg (23 October 1457) to end the Münster Bishops Feud (1450-1457). During the Anabaptist Rebellion (1534–1535) in Münster, the Herrn von Merveldt went to the side of the Prince-Bishop of Münster. Dietrich von Merveldt (died 1564), Drost of Wolbeck, undertook in 1532 an unsuccessful attempt to restore the order of a levy on the farmers in the city.

While the Westerwinkel Line therefore always stayed in contact with the sovereign of the Prince-Bishopric, the Merfeld Line looked in late 16th and early 17th Centuries to defend its domains against all sovereign influences. Claiming its own jurisdiction, including the place of execution and the development of a Reformed church system in Merfeld was for Adolf III von Merveldt (1546–1604) and Johann Adolf von Merveldt (1580–1619) the appropriate tools for the defense of their local domination. The religious opposition against the Prince-Bishop - typical of many families of the Westphalian nobility at this time - after the Thirty Years' War and the inheritance of the House of Merfeld by the Herrn von Merode (1693) cost the family its importance, but the jurisdiction claimed by the House of Merfeld was kept for it until the end of the Prince-Bishopric (1803).

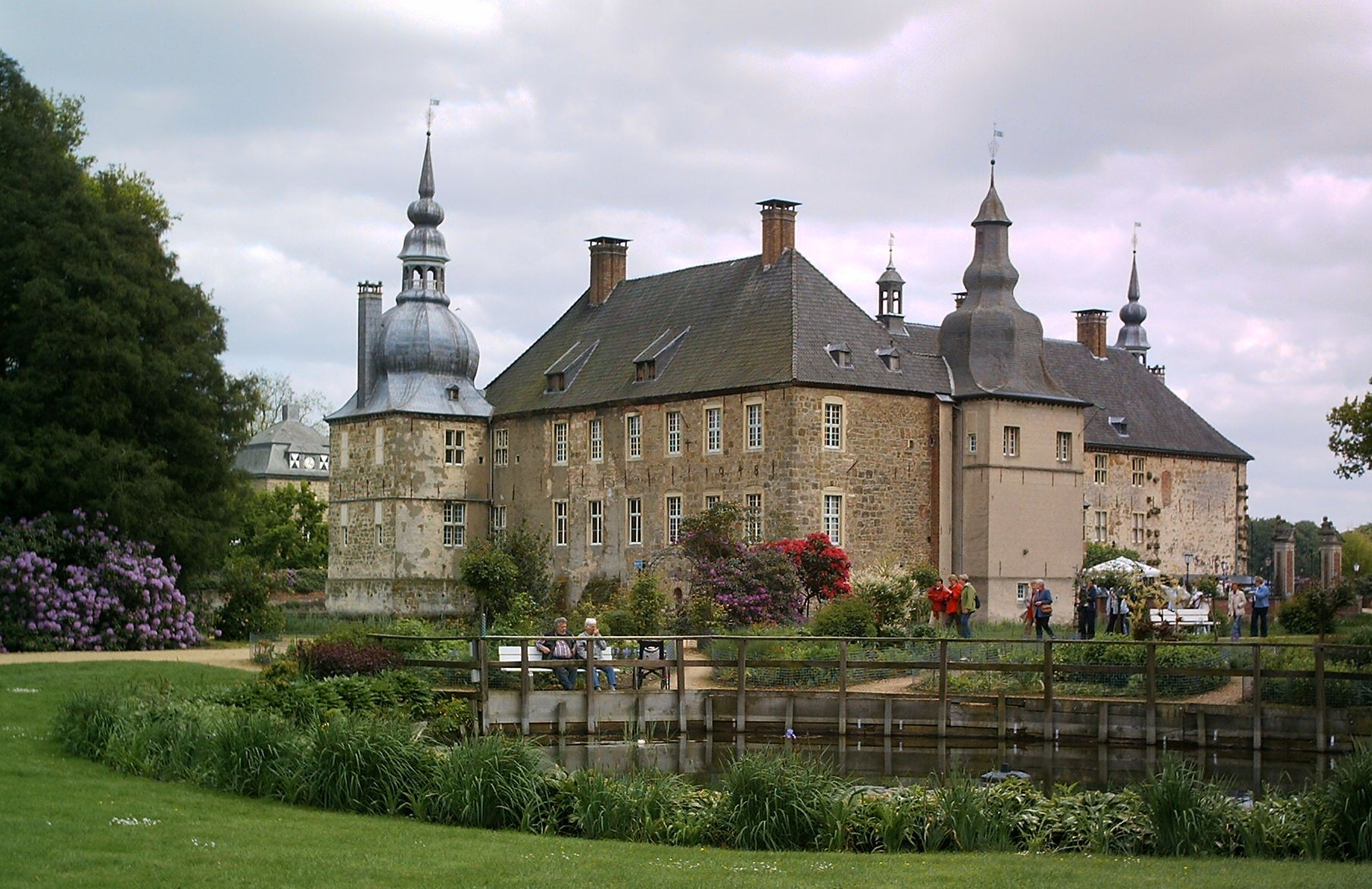
Schloss Lembeck, Baroque castle still owned by the family

From the Westerwinkel Line was Dietrich Hermann von Merveldt (1598–1658) the Lord Chamberlain of the Electorate of Cologne and minister at the Imperial Diets of Regensburg. Beginning with his son Dietrich Hermann II von Merveldt (1624–1688), all the hereditary heads of the family were (Obrist-)Hofmarschälle [(Colonel-) Court Marshals], members of the (Secret) Councils and Drosten of Wolbeck, all for the Prince-Bishops of Münster. Maximilian Friedrich von Merveldt (1764–1815), Austrian Feldmarschall-Leutnant [Lieutenant Field Marshal] and regimental commander, participated in the 1813 Battle of Leipzig and later became an ambassador in London.

=== Possessions ===
During the 19th century the family owned the manors of Lembeck, Ostendorf and Hagenbeck in the District of Recklinghausen, Steinhaus in Werne, the Burg Geinegge (a castle in Bockum-Hovel) and the Schloss Westerwinkel (in Ascheberg-Herbern) in the District of Ludinghausen (after 1975, District of Coesfeld), Wolbeck bei Muenster, Huxdiek and Seppenhagen in the District of Beckum (after 1975, District of Warendorf), Feckenhorst in the District of Warendorf, Empte in the District of Coesfeld and - because of the marriage into the family of the Barons Droste zu Hülshoff (most famous family member was Annette von Droste-Hülshoff) - the manor of Füchtel in Vechta (Lower Saxony). From 1717 to 1923 the family also had a Familienfideikommiss [a legal way to keep its lands and finances together in its single head for generations].

=== Achievements ===
Dietrich Hermann von Merveldt (1624–1688), Privy Chamberlain of the Prince-Bishop of Münster and the Drost of Wolbeck, was raised on 17 February 1668 by Emperor Leopold I to the rank of Reichsfreiherr [Imperial Baron]. Goswin Hermann Otto von Merveldt (1661–1727) was, between 1721 and 1727, the Grand Prior of the Order of St. John “in the German lands” and, in this position, also the Reichsfürst [Imperial Prince] of Heitersheim. On 20 December 1726 was Dietrich Burchard Reichsfreiherr von Merveldt, Councilor and Lord Chamberlain for the Elector of Cologne and the Prince-Bishop of Münster, and all his descendants were raised by Emperor Charles VI to the rank of Reichsgraf [Imperial Count] with the title of Hoch- und Wohlgeboren [“High and Well-Born”] and an upgrade for his coat-of-arms.

Furthermore, the Lords von Merveldt were awarded the diploma of the Hereditary Marshals of the District of Merveldt in the Principality of Münster by Prussian ceremony in Berlin on 28 December 1846 in primogeniture (for the first-born of the either gender). The Bohemian Inkolat [the rights and privileges of the nobility] in the peerage was received by Maximilian von Merveldt, Imperial and Royal Chamberlain and Privy Councillor as well as Major General and Lord Chamberlain of Archduke Franz Karl, on 26 February 1848 to Vienna.

== Coat of arms ==
The family coat of arms shows in blue a golden lattice, consisting of six raised and toppled rafters. On the helmet is a smaller shield with the same design, between two blue ostrich feathers, each bound with three oblique bands of gold. The helmet's mantle is blue and gold. (The von und zu Merfeld Line bears a red grid on the golden background.)

== Notable members ==
- Felix Friedrich Graf [Count] von Merveldt (1862–1926), German officer and politician (German National People's Party)
- Ferdinand von Merveldt (1840–1906), landowner and member of the Prussian House of Lords
- Hanns Hubertus Graf von Merveldt (1901–1969), painter
- Karl von Merveldt (1790–1859), Landrat [District Councilman] and member of the Prussian House of Lords
- Maximilian Friedrich von Merveldt (1764-1815), German Army officer and diplomat in the service of the Habsburgs

== Literature ==
- (de) Rudolfine Freiin von Oer: Merveldt, von. In: Neue Deutsche Biographie [New German Biography] (NDB). Band 17 [Volume 17], Berlin, Duncker & Humblot, 1994, p. 191-193.
- (de) Otto Hupp: Münchener Kalender 1910 [Munich Calendar 1910]. München / Regensburg, Buch u. Kunstdruckerei AG, 1910.
- (de) Bastian Gillner: Freie Herren - Freie Religion. Der Adel des Oberstifts Münster zwischen konfessionellem Konflikt und staatlicher Verdichtung 1500-1700 (= Westfalen in der Vormoderne 8) [Free Lords - Free Religion. The Nobility of the Münster Bishopric between Religious Conflict and Secular Growth 1570-1700 (=Westphalia in the Pre-Modern Age, Volume 8)], Münster 2011, ISBN 978-3-402-15050-4.
- (de) Bastian Gillner: “Schloß und Kirche. Zur adeligen Nutzung des dörflichen Kirchenraumes im frühneuzeitlichen Stift Münster [Castle and Church: Noble Use of the Village Church Domain in the Early Modern Diocese of Münster]”. In: Adel und Umwelt: Horizonte adeliger Existenz in der frühen Neuzeit [Nobility and the Environment: Horizons of the Noble Existence in the Early Modern Age], ed. by Heike Düselder, et al., Köln 2008, p. 181 ff. ISBN 978-3-412-20131-9
- (de) Heinrich Glasmeier: “Das Geschlecht von Merveldt zu Merfeld, Ein Beitrag zur Familien- und Standesgeschichte der Münsterschen Ritterschaft [The Family von Merveldt from Merfeld, a Contribution to the Familial and Professional History of the Knighthood of Münster]”. In: Stand und Land in Westfalen [Status and Land in Westphalia], ed. by Dr. Heinrich Glasmeier, Heft 6 [Issue 6], Bocholt, Verlag F&A Temming, 1931.
- (de) Genealogisches Handbuch des Adels, Adelslexikon Band VIII, Band 113 der Gesamtreihe [Genealogical Handbook of the Nobility, Dictionary of the Nobility Volume VIII, Volume 113 of the Whole Series], Limburg an der Lahn, C. A. Starke Verlag, 1997, ISSN 0435-2408
- (de) Genealogisches Handbuch des Adels, Adelslexikon Band XVIII, Band 139 der Gesamtreihe [Genealogical Handbook of the Nobility, Dictionary of the Nobility Volume XVIII, Volume 139 of the Whole Series], Limburg an der Lahn, C. A. Starke Verlag, 2006, ISSN 0435-2408
- (de) Arnold Robens: Der ritterbürtige landständische Adel des Großherzogthums Niederrhein : dargestellt in Wapen und Abstammungen [The Knightly Estates of the Grand Duchy of Lower Rhein, with Coats of Arms and Lineages], Aachen (Weiß) (Band 1 [Volume 1]), Wiesbaden, Neudr. im LTR-Verlag, 1818, ISBN 3-88706-054-7
