= Jan de Vries (Canadian Army soldier) =

Canadian WWII veteran and advocate

- Born: 24 January 1924; Leeuwarden, Netherlands
- Died: 27 May 2012 (aged 88); Ajax, Ontario, Canada
- Burial place: Pine Hills Cemetery, Scarborough, Canada
- Military career
- Allegiance: Canada
- Branch: Canadian Army
- Service years: 1943–1945
- Rank: Paratrooper
- Unit: 1st Canadian Parachute Battalion
- Conflicts: World War II; Operation Overlord; Normandy landings; Battle of the Bulge; Operation Varsity
- Awards: Order of Canada; Legion of Honour

Jan de Vries, CM (24 January 1924 – 27 May 2012) was a Dutch-born Canadian World War II paratrooper and veteran's advocate. From June 1944 to June 1945 he was active with the 1st Canadian Parachute Battalion. He served with them from the Normandy Invasion until the unit made it all the way to the German Baltic coast by the end of the war. His work as a board member of the Juno Beach Centre contributed to its creation and was at Normandy in June 2005 for its official opening. He also worked hard at successfully fundraising to prevent Canadian Army medals being sold to foreign buyers, including the rare Victoria Cross. For his advocacy and public speaking, he was made a member of the Order of Canada in 2007. He died in Ajax, Ontario in May 2012.

== Early life ==
Jan de Vries was born on 24 January 1924 in Leeuwarden, Friesland, Netherlands. He immigrated to Canada with his father Romke and mother Rinske de Vries in 1930. His family included his brother, Harry. They lived in the Township of East York, Ontario, where the family operated a gasoline station and he worked there in his teenage years. He attended school at both East York Collegiate Institute and Scarborough Collegiate Institute.

== Military service ==
He enlisted in the army in 1943. De Vries served with the 1st Canadian Parachute Battalion, parachuting into Normandy on D-Day and later parachuting across the Rhine River into Germany on March 24, 1945. He was wounded in action by a German sniper in July 1944, however had returned to combat by September 1944.

When he came home, he worked in the construction trades, and moved up into managing sites for Cadillac Fairview and the Daniels Group Inc.

== Philanthropy ==
De Vries was a member of the Royal Canadian Legion for 40 years. Additionally, de Vries served on the Advisory Board of the Canadian Airborne Forces Museum as well as on the Board of the Canadian Airborne Forces Association. His efforts contributed to the successful opening of the Juno Beach Centre. As a founding member of the Living History Speakers Bureau and a member of the Dominion Institute Memory Project, de Vries also regularly spoke to school children and cadet groups, including the Cadet Basic Parachutist Course, regarding Canadian contributions during World War II.

Also, in 2004, de Vries was Honorary Chairman of the Corporal Frederick Topham Victoria Cross fundraising project. Because of this fundraiser, all of Topham's medals are displayed at the Canadian War Museum, including his Victoria Cross. He was a Patron of the Victoria Cross Trust.

He served as a President of the 1st Canadian Parachute Battalion Association for twelve years. Under his leadership, the Association installed memorial plaques in Europe to commemorate their fallen comrades. On 25 March 2007, de Vries and other members of the 1st Canadian Parachute Battalion Association, placed a plaque near Frederick Topham's grave at Sanctuary Park Cemetery, in the Toronto suburb of Etobicoke. The large plaque recounts Topham's Victoria Cross gallantry and his family was there to receive it.

== Honours ==
In June 2004, de Vries was named a Chevalier of the French Legion of Honour by President Jacques Chirac. For his advocacy, public speaking, and educational endeavours to keep the history of Second World War troops alive, he was invested into the Order of Canada as a member on 4 May 2007. In 2010 he was selected as an Olympic torchbearer as part of the 2010 Olympic Games.

== Personal life ==
He was married to Joanne de Vries (née Nicoll), and was the father of six children.

== Death ==
He died on 27 May 2012 at the Ajax-Pickering Hospital and is buried at Pine Hills Cemetery in Scarborough.
