= Stuart S. Stryker =

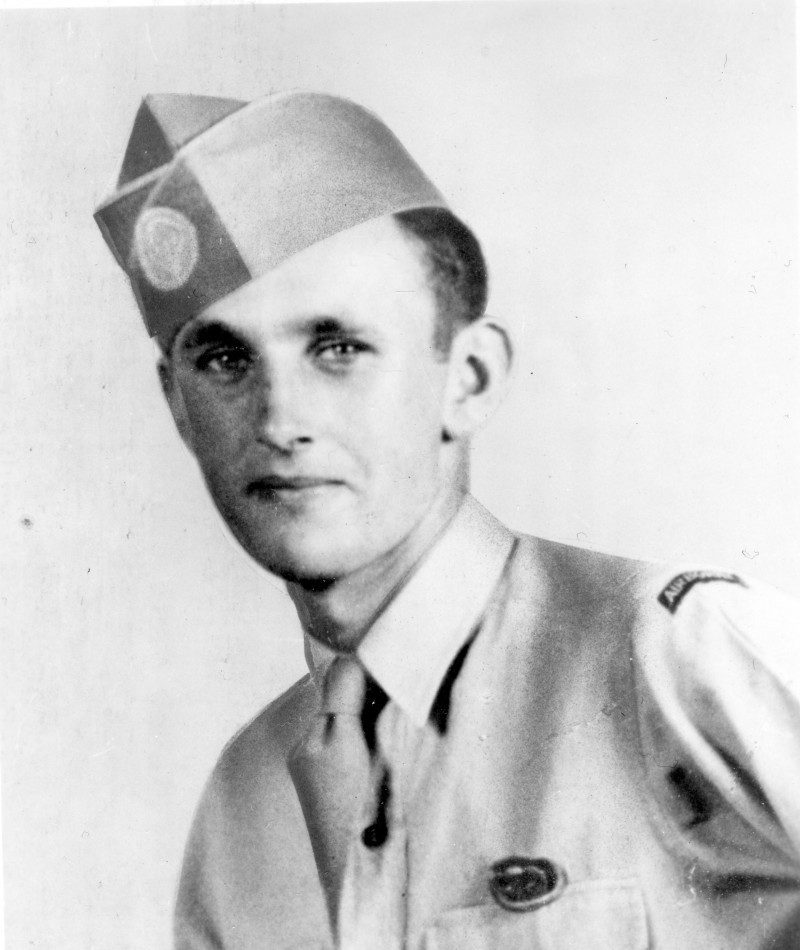
- Born: October 30, 1924; Portland, Oregon, United States
- Died: March 24, 1945 (aged 20); Wesel, Germany
- Burial place: Golden Gate National Cemetery, San Bruno, California, United States
- Military career
- Allegiance: United States
- Branch: United States Army
- Service years: 1943–1945
- Rank: Private First Class
- Conflicts: World War II: Western Allied invasion of Germany; Operation Plunder; Operation Varsity †
- Awards: Medal of Honor

Stuart Stanton Stryker (October 30, 1924 – March 24, 1945) was a United States Army soldier and a recipient of the U.S. military's highest decoration, the Medal of Honor, for his actions in World War II.

The Stryker combat vehicle is partially named after Stuart Stryker, as well as another Medal of Honor recipient, Robert F. Stryker, who was not related to Stuart.

== Biography ==
Born on October 30, 1924, in Portland, Oregon, Stryker enlisted in the Army in that city in July 1943. He served in Europe and became a private first class in Company E of the 513th Parachute Infantry Regiment, 17th Airborne Division.

During Operation Varsity on March 24, 1945, Stryker's company attacked a strongly defended building near Wesel, Germany. When a platoon tasked with making a frontal assault became pinned down by intense fire, Stryker voluntarily ran to the head of the unit, called for the soldiers to follow him, and charged the German position. He was killed by hostile fire 25 yards (23 m) from the building. His attack provided a diversion which allowed other elements of Company E to take the position, capturing over 200 soldiers and freeing three American airmen held as prisoners by the Germans. For these actions, Stryker was posthumously awarded the Medal of Honor nine months later, on December 11, 1945. He was one of three people to earn the medal during Operation Varsity, the others being Private First Class George J. Peters and Technical Sergeant Clinton Hedrick.

Aged 20 at his death, Stryker was buried at Golden Gate National Cemetery in San Bruno, California. In 2002, the U.S. Army named its new armored fighting vehicle "Stryker" in honor of both Stuart Stryker and fellow Medal of Honor recipient Robert F. Stryker. The two men were not relatives.

== Medal of Honor citation ==
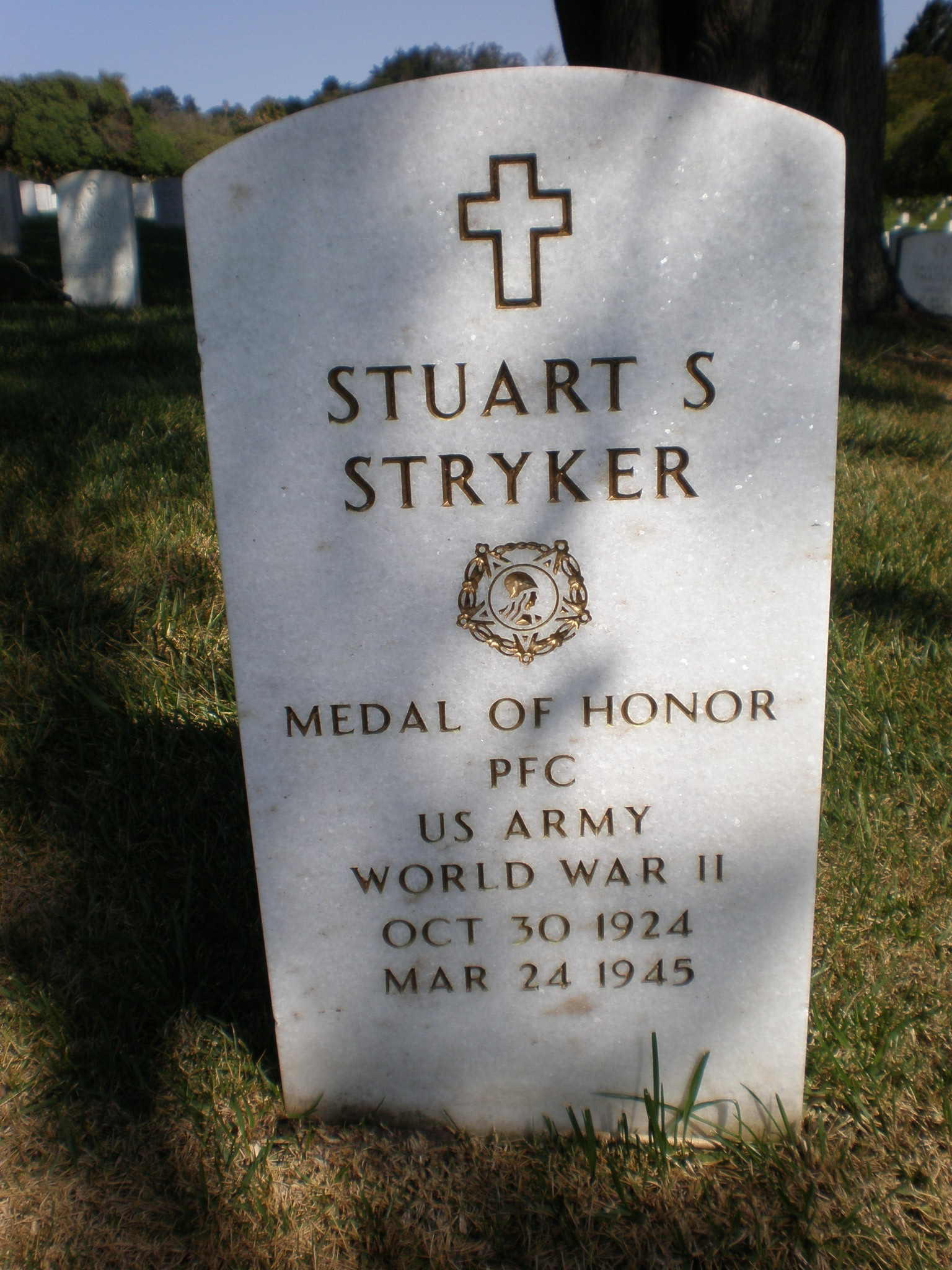
Stryker's headstone

Stryker's official Medal of Honor citation reads:

He was a platoon runner, when the unit assembled near Wesel, Germany after a descent east of the Rhine. Attacking along a railroad, Company E reached a point about 250 yards from a large building used as an enemy headquarters and manned by a powerful force of Germans with rifles, machineguns, and 4 field pieces. One platoon made a frontal assault but was pinned down by intense fire from the house after advancing only 50 yards. So badly stricken that it could not return the raking fire, the platoon was at the mercy of German machine gunners when Pfc. Stryker voluntarily left a place of comparative safety, and, armed with a carbine, ran to the head of the unit. In full view of the enemy and under constant fire, he exhorted the men to get to their feet and follow him. Inspired by his fearlessness, they rushed after him in a desperate charge through an increased hail of bullets. Twenty-five yards from the objective the heroic soldier was killed by the enemy fusillades. His gallant and wholly voluntary action in the face of overwhelming firepower, however, so encouraged his comrades and diverted the enemy's attention that other elements of the company were able to surround the house, capturing more than 200 hostile soldiers and much equipment, besides freeing 3 members of an American bomber crew held prisoner there. The intrepidity and unhesitating self-sacrifice of Pfc. Stryker were in keeping with the highest traditions of the military service. Monumental plaque of Stuart Stryker was put up in Hamminkeln by Dutch researcher and Battlefield tourguide Jos Bex in 2024.

== See also ==
- List of Medal of Honor recipients for World War II
- George J. Peters awarded the Medal of Honor for an action during the same operation, on the same day
- Frederick George Topham awarded the Victoria Cross for an action during the same operation, on the same day
