= Frederick George Topham =

Canadian recipient of the Victoria Cross

Frederick George Topham VC
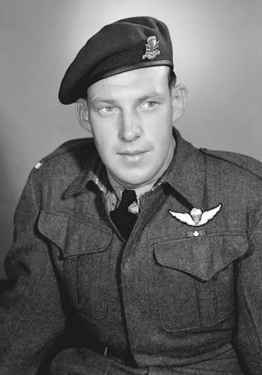
- Born: 10 August 1917; Toronto, Ontario, Canada
- Died: 31 May 1974 (aged 56); Toronto, Ontario, Canada
- Burial place: Sanctuary Park Cemetery, Etobicoke, Canada
- Military career
- Allegiance: Canada
- Branch: Canadian Army
- Service years: 1942–1945
- Rank: Corporal
- Unit: 1st Canadian Parachute Battalion
- Conflicts: Second World War: Operation Varsity
- Awards: Victoria Cross

Frederick George Topham, VC (10 August 1917 – 31 May 1974) was a Canadian recipient of the Victoria Cross, the highest award for gallantry in Commonwealth forces. He was from Toronto, and was a medical orderly with the 1st Canadian Parachute Battalion. His unit took part in the Battle of Normandy and stayed in France until early September 1944. Then, the unit was involved from March to May 1945 in operations in Germany. It was in those operations, that he received his Victoria Cross. Post-war, he worked for Toronto Hydro and kept a low-profile. He died suddenly in Toronto in 1974 at age 56.

== Early life ==
Frederick George Topham was born in York Township, Toronto, Canada, on 10 August 1917. He grew up at 631 Beresford Avenue. He was the son of Harry A. Topham and had two sisters, Lenore and Marion, as well as a brother, Robert J. Topham. Topham attended King George Public School and Runnymede High School, which is now known as Runnymede Collegiate Institute. Prior to the outbreak of World War II, he worked as a miner in the seams of Kirkland Lake.

== Second World War service ==
Topham enlisted in the Canadian Army during the Second World War on 3 August 1942, and served at home and abroad as a medical orderly, initially with the 48th Highlanders of Canada, before transferring to the Royal Canadian Army Service Corps (RCASC).

However, he volunteered for service with the Canadian Army's airborne forces and found himself in the 1st Canadian Parachute Battalion, with whom he was to remain for the rest of the war. He trained in Canada with the battalion which, in the summer of 1943, was sent to England where it became part of Brigadier James Hill's 3rd Parachute Brigade of the British 6th Airborne Division, commanded by Major General Richard Gale.

The division was earmarked for an assault role for the upcoming invasion of Normandy, then scheduled for the spring of 1944, and highly intensive training continued with an ever heightening intensity. In the early hours of 6 June 1944 (now known as D-Day) Topham's battalion dropped into Normandy (see Operation Tonga) as part of Operation Overlord. In heavy fighting, the battalion sustained heavy losses. It spent the next two months on the defensive (contrary to what the airborne troops had been trained for) before pursuing retreating German forces to the River Seine (see 6th Airborne Division advance to the River Seine). In September, after almost three months of fighting, the division was withdrawn to England.

In December the division, now commanded by Major General Eric Bols, was sent to Belgium where it played a relatively minor role in the Battle of the Bulge. Topham's battalion gained the distinction of being the only Canadian Army units to fight in the campaign.

During Operation Varsity, the Western Allies' attempt to cross the River Rhine, on March 24, 1945, while serving with the battalion, commanded by Lieutenant Colonel Jeff Nicklin, Topham defied heavy enemy fire to treat casualties sustained in a parachute drop east of the Rhine, near Wesel. Rejecting treatment for his own severe face wound, he continued to rescue the injured for two hours. While returning to his company, he saved three occupants of a burning carrier which was in danger of exploding. For these exceptional deeds, Topham was awarded the Victoria Cross, the highest decoration for valour in the British Commonwealth.

== Victoria Cross citation ==
He was 27 years old, and a corporal (medical orderly) in the 1st Canadian Parachute Battalion, Canadian Army during the Second World War when the following deeds took place for which he was awarded the VC:

Department of National Defence, Ottawa. 3rd August, 1945.

THE CANADIAN ARMY.

The KING has been graciously pleased to approve the award of the VICTORIA CROSS to: —

No. B.39039 Corporal Frederick George TOPHAM, 1st Canadian Parachute Battalion.

On 24th March, 1945, Corporal Topham, a medical orderly, parachuted with his Battalion on to a strongly defended area east of the Rhine. At about 1100 hours, whilst treating casualties sustained in the drop, a cry for help came from a wounded man in the open. Two medical orderlies from a field ambulance went out to this man in succession but both were killed as they knelt beside the casualty.

Without hesitation and on his own initiative, Corporal Topham went forward through intense fire to replace the orderlies who had been killed before his eyes. As he worked on the wounded man, he was himself shot through the nose. In spite of severe bleeding and intense pain, he never faltered in his task. Having completed immediate first aid, he carried the wounded man steadily and slowly back through continuous fire to the shelter of a wood.

During the next two hours Corporal Topham refused all offers of medical help for his own wound. He worked most devotedly throughout this period to bring in wounded, showing complete disregard for the heavy and accurate enemy fire. It was only when all casualties had been cleared that he consented to his own wound being treated.

His immediate evacuation was ordered, but he interceded so earnestly on his own behalf that he was eventually allowed to return to duty.

On his way back to his company he came across a carrier, which had received a direct hit. Enemy mortar bombs were still dropping around, the carrier itself was burning fiercely and its own mortar ammunition was exploding. An experienced officer on the spot had warned all not to approach the carrier.

Corporal Topham, however, immediately went out alone in spite of the blasting ammunition and enemy fire, and rescued the three occupants of the carrier. He brought these men back across the open and although one died almost immediately afterwards, he arranged for the evacuation of the other two, who undoubtedly owe their lives to him.

This N.C.O. showed sustained gallantry of the highest order. For six hours, most of the time in great pain, he performed a series of acts of outstanding bravery and his magnificent and selfless courage inspired all those who witnessed it.

== Post-War ==
Topham's heroism was acknowledged publicly with a parade and civic reception in Toronto on 8 August 1945. 100 members of the 1st Canadian Parachute Battalion served as his honour guard. At Toronto City Hall's square, he received gifts from Toronto mayor Robert Saunders and York Township reeve F.J. McRea.

After the war, Topham took little part in military affairs. On November 10, 1945, he laid the cornerstone of the new Sunnybrook Memorial Hospital for Veterans. Topham served briefly as a constable with the Toronto Police Department before moving onto a career as an emergency troubleman, a first responder to electrical system issues, with Toronto Hydro.

Topham died suddenly on 31 May 1974 at his home on Templar Drive in Etobicoke, aged 56. His widow, Mary, decided on a private funeral service on 3 June 1974, even though the Victoria Cross winner was entitled to a military funeral. He is buried at Sanctuary Park Cemetery, in the Toronto suburb of Etobicoke. Over 30 years later, a plaque recounting his Victoria Cross gallantry was placed there on 25 March 2007 by members of the 1st Canadian Parachute Battalion Association.

== Legacy ==
Topham's medals were on loan to the Canadian War Museum, but were not permanently on display. His widow, Mary Topham, did not bequeath the medal to the museum, or to anyone else, in her will. So, the will's executors decided it was in the beneficiaries' best interest to sell the medal.

The Corporal Fred Topham, VC Fundraising Project was formed by members of the 1st Canadian Parachute Battalion Association and The Queen's Own Rifles of Canada to retain the medal in Canada. In mid-December 2004, the fundraising project exceeded its $275,000 goal and raised $300,000, allowing them to meet the 31 December deadline and acquire Topham's medals from his extended family. On 24 March 2005, on the 60th anniversary of Corporal Topham's VC action, the 1st Canadian Parachute Battalion Association presented Topham's medals to the Canadian War Museum in Ottawa, where they are on permanent display.

The Ontario Heritage Foundation, erected a plaque at the Etobicoke Civic Centre in 1980 commemorating Corporal Frederick Topham, V.C. (1917–74). This plaque has since been erected outside Runnymede College Institute.

A two-hectare park in Toronto's East York neighbourhood, near St. Clair Avenue East and O'Connor Drive was named for Topham. It features three baseball diamonds, two lit tennis courts, a wading pool, a children's playground, and the Topham Park Community Centre and Clubhouse.

== See also ==
- George J. Peters posthumously awarded the Medal of Honor for an action during the same operation, on the same day
- Stuart S. Stryker posthumously awarded the Medal of Honor for an action during the same operation, on the same day
