= Storepedo =

Storage container with an attached parachute

A storepedo, or alternately storpedo, is a cylindrical storage container with an attached parachute.

Resupplying troops in the jungle by air drop during World War II was proving problematic. Regular parachutes were costly in both money and material. Drops without parachutes risked loss of the materials due to the impact.

The Australian Inventions Directorate in headed by Sir Laurence Hartnett tasked the Ordnance Production Directorate to produce a solution.

G.W Griffiths, on a secondment with the directorate, came up with the answer. to examine the problem. A shock absorbent heavy-gauge wire netting container to absorb the impact. Griffiths named this an 'Aeropak'. The design also allows for a parachute to be attached to slow the descent.

The design was refined by Morris & Walker Pty Ltd of Melbourne. The printing firm added a three-foot cardboard cylinder to carry 250lbs. A hessian parachute was also added. The hollow nose cone is hollow which also takes a proportion on the impact.

The Storpedo was test dropped from a Douglas C-47 Skytrain aircraft at Nadzab in New Guinea in 1944.

The Storepedo was used by Australian and US forces in the South-West Pacific. Small aircraft, for example the CAC Wirraway, could carry the container. Use of smaller aircraft resulted in greater accuracy of the drops.

The Storpedo was used to supply liberated prisoners of war in Timor following the 1945 surrender of Japan.

After the war, the Storpedo was used to supply victims of flooding in New South Wales.

The names on the patent are E.R. Campbell, K.M. Frewin, F.W. Lennox and R.P. Morris.

== See also ==
- CLE Canister
