= George J. Peters =

United States Army Medal of Honor recipient

- Born: March 19, 1924; Cranston, Rhode Island
- Died: March 24, 1945 (aged 21); Wesel, Germany
- Burial place: Netherlands American Cemetery, Margraten, the Netherlands
- Military career
- Allegiance: United States
- Branch: United States Army
- Service years: 1943–1945
- Rank: Private
- Units: 507th Parachute Infantry Regiment, 17th Airborne Division
- Conflicts: World War II: European theatre; Western Front; Western Allied invasion of Germany; Operation Plunder; Operation Varsity
- Awards: Medal of Honor; Purple Heart

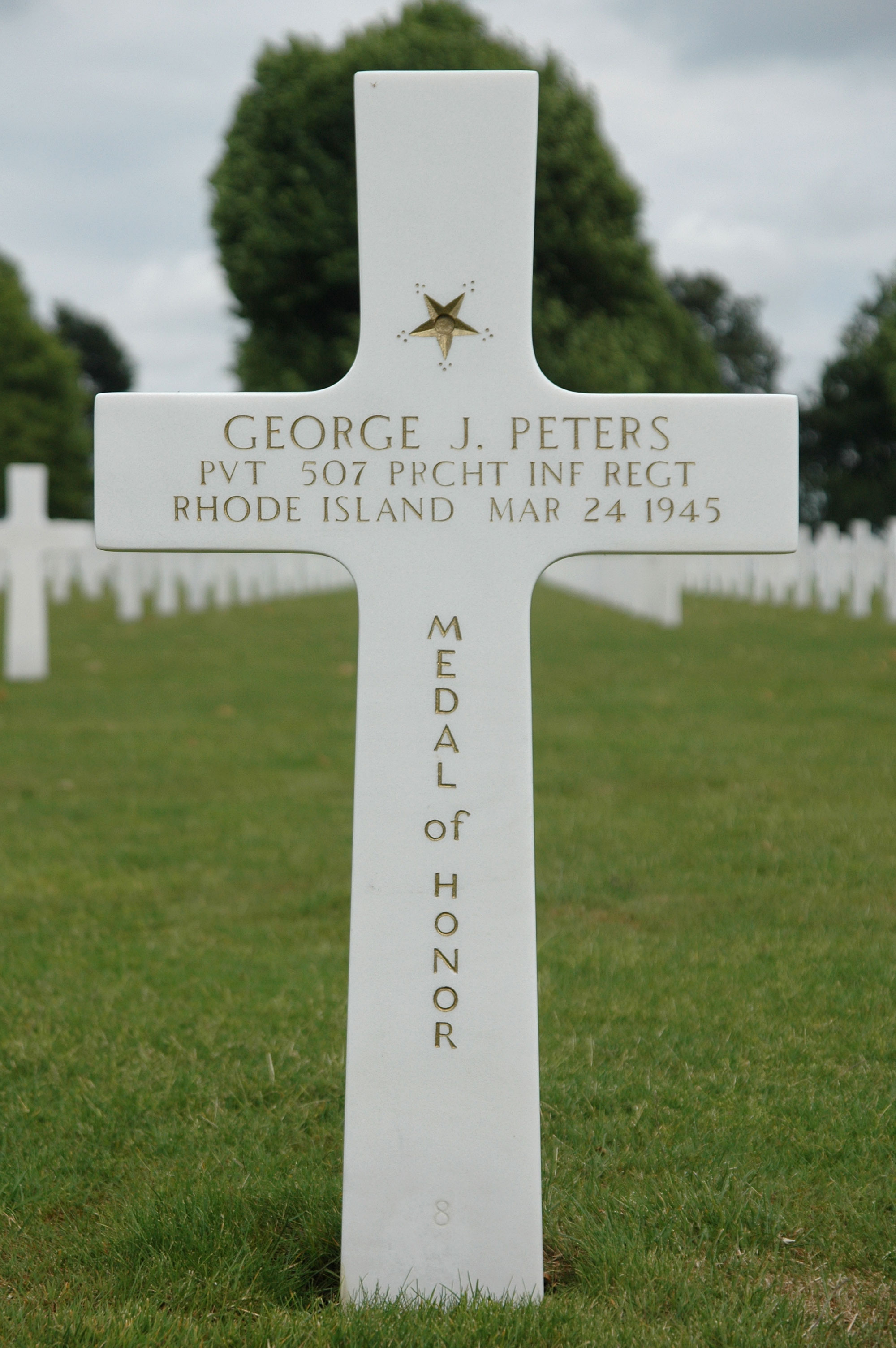

George Joseph Peters (March 19, 1924 – March 24, 1945) was a soldier of the United States Army and a recipient of the highest decoration of the United States Armed Forces—the Medal of Honor—for his actions in the final stages of World War II during Operation Varsity.

== Biography ==
Peters joined the United States Army from his birth city of Cranston, Rhode Island, in 1943, and by March 24, 1945, was serving as a private in Company G, 507th Parachute Infantry Regiment, 17th Airborne Division. On that day, his unit was dropped by parachute across the Rhine river near Flüren, suburb of Wesel, Germany. Immediately upon landing, Peters single-handedly attacked a German machine gun emplacement which was firing on his group. He succeeded in destroying the position despite being mortally wounded during his advance. He was posthumously awarded the Medal of Honor eleven months later, on February 8, 1946.

Peters was buried at the Netherlands American Cemetery, in Margraten, the Netherlands.

== Medal of Honor citation ==
Private Peters' Medal of Honor citation reads:

Pvt. Peters, a platoon radio operator with Company G, made a descent into Germany near Fluren, east of the Rhine. With 10 others, he landed in a field about 75 yards from a German machinegun supported by riflemen, and was immediately pinned down by heavy, direct fire. The position of the small unit seemed hopeless with men struggling to free themselves of their parachutes in a hail of bullets that cut them off from their nearby equipment bundles, when Pvt. Peters stood up without orders and began a 1-man charge against the hostile emplacement armed only with a rifle and grenades. His single-handed assault immediately drew the enemy fire away from his comrades. He had run halfway to his objective, pitting rifle fire against that of the machinegun, when he was struck and knocked to the ground by a burst. Heroically, he regained his feet and struggled onward. Once more he was torn by bullets, and this time he was unable to rise. With gallant devotion to his self-imposed mission, he crawled directly into the fire that had mortally wounded him until close enough to hurl grenades which knocked out the machinegun, killed 2 of its operators, and drove protecting riflemen from their positions into the safety of a woods. By his intrepidity and supreme sacrifice, Pvt. Peters saved the lives of many of his fellow soldiers and made it possible for them to reach their equipment, organize, and seize their first objective.

== Awards and Decorations ==

Badge	Combat Infantryman Badge		
1st row	Medal of Honor		
2nd row	Bronze Star Medal	Purple Heart	Army Good Conduct Medal
3rd row	American Campaign Medal	European–African–Middle Eastern Campaign Medal with Arrowhead Device and 1 Campaign star	World War II Victory Medal
4th row	Parachutist Badge		
Unit awards	Presidential Unit Citation		

== See also ==
- List of Medal of Honor recipients
- List of Medal of Honor recipients for World War II
- Stuart S. Stryker awarded the Medal of Honor for an action during the same operation, on the same day
- Frederick George Topham awarded the Victoria Cross for an action during the same operation, on the same day
