= Robert F. Stryker =

American soldier (1944–1967)

Robert Francis Stryker
- Army Medal of Honor
- Born: November 9, 1944; Auburn, New York, US
- Died: November 7, 1967 (aged 22); Bình Long, Binh Phuoc Province, South Vietnam
- Burial place: Pine Hill Cemetery, Throop, New York
- Military career
- Allegiance: United States
- Branch: United States Army
- Service years: 1963–67
- Rank: Specialist Four
- Units: Company C, 1st Battalion, 26th Infantry Regiment, 1st Infantry Division
- Conflicts: Vietnam War (DOW)
- Awards: Medal of Honor; Bronze Star; Purple Heart

Robert Francis Stryker (November 9, 1944 – November 7, 1967) was a United States Army soldier who posthumously received the Medal of Honor for his actions during the Vietnam War. Vice President Spiro Agnew awarded the medal in a ceremony that also honored John Andrew Barnes III and Fr. Charles J. Watters.

The Stryker combat vehicle is named in his and Pfc. Stuart S. Stryker's honor (no relation).

Stryker joined the army in 1963.

== Medal of Honor citation ==
Rank and organization: Specialist Four, U.S. Army, Company C, 1st Battalion, 26th Infantry Regiment, 1st Infantry Division. Place and date: Near Loc Ninh, Republic of Vietnam, November 7, 1967. Entered service at: Throop, New York. Born: November 9, 1944, Auburn, New York.

Citation:

For conspicuous gallantry and intrepidity at the risk of his life above and beyond the call of duty. Specialist Stryker, U.S. Army, distinguished himself while serving with Company C. Spec. Stryker was serving as a grenadier in a multicompany reconnaissance in force near Loc Ninh. As his unit moved through the dense underbrush, it was suddenly met with a hail of rocket, automatic weapons and small arms fire from enemy forces concealed in fortified bunkers and in the surrounding trees. Reacting quickly, Spec. Stryker fired into the enemy positions with his grenade launcher. During the devastating exchange of fire, Spec. Stryker detected enemy elements attempting to encircle his company and isolate it from the main body of the friendly force. Undaunted by the enemy machinegun and small-arms fire, Spec. Stryker repeatedly fired grenades into the trees, killing enemy snipers and enabling his comrades to sever the attempted encirclement. As the battle continued, Spec. Stryker observed several wounded members of his squad in the killing zone of an enemy claymore mine. With complete disregard for his safety, he threw himself upon the mine as it was detonated. He was mortally wounded as his body absorbed the blast and shielded his comrades from the explosion. His unselfish actions were responsible for saving the lives of at least 6 of his fellow soldiers. Spec. Stryker's great personal bravery was in keeping with the highest traditions of the military service and reflects great credit upon himself, his unit, and the U.S. Army.

== See also ==
- List of Medal of Honor recipients
- List of Medal of Honor recipients for the Vietnam War
