= CLE Canister =

WW2 era British parachute dropped container

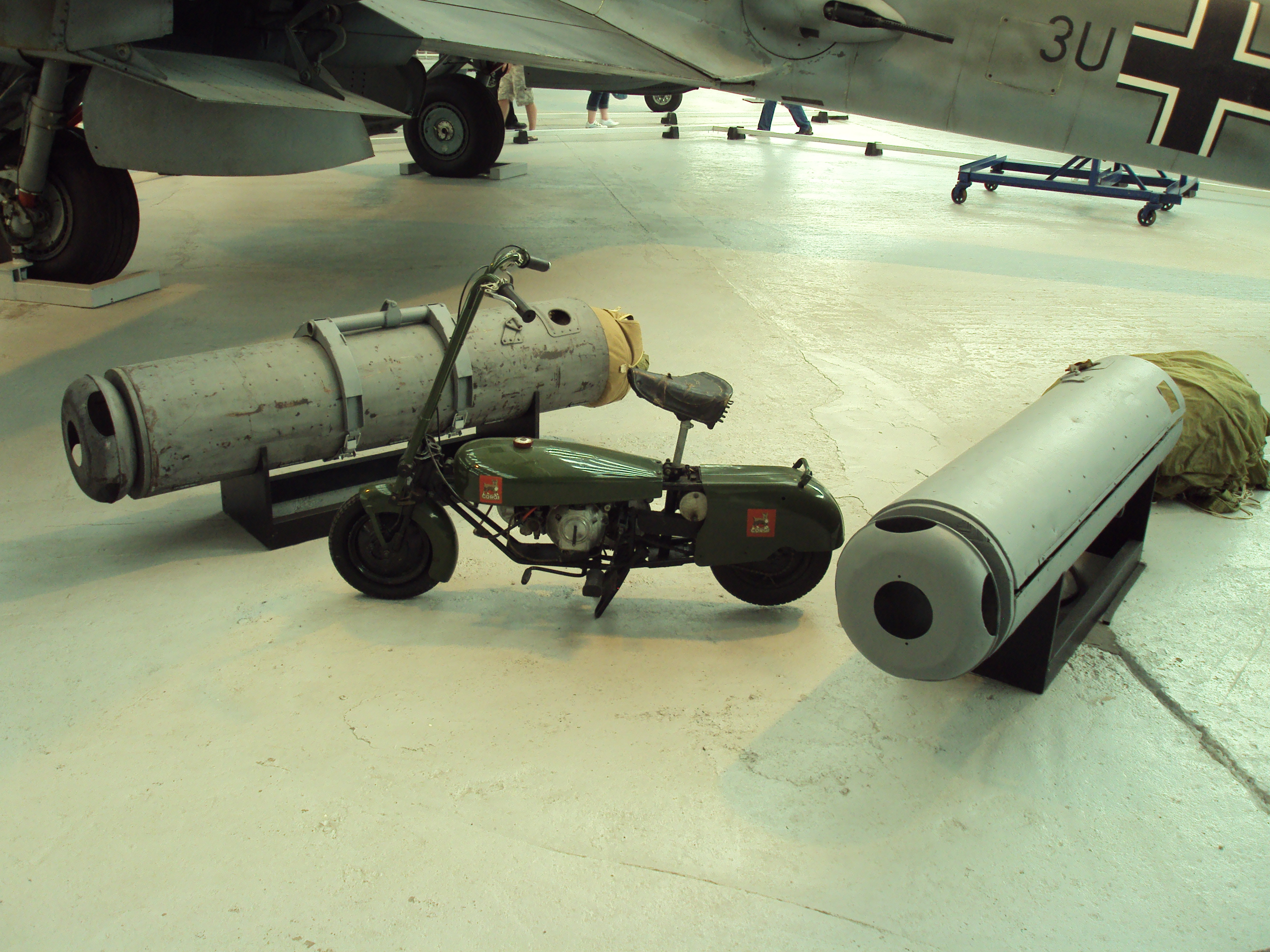
CLE Canisters displayed at the Royal Air Force Museum Cosford, along with a Corgi lightweight, folding motorcycle that could be carried inside one (2010)

The CLE Canister, or CLE Container was a standardized cylindrical container used by the British during World War II to airdrop supplies to troops on the ground. The name initially derived from the Central Landing Establishment that developed them, although this was later backronymed to Container Light Equipment.

== Design ==
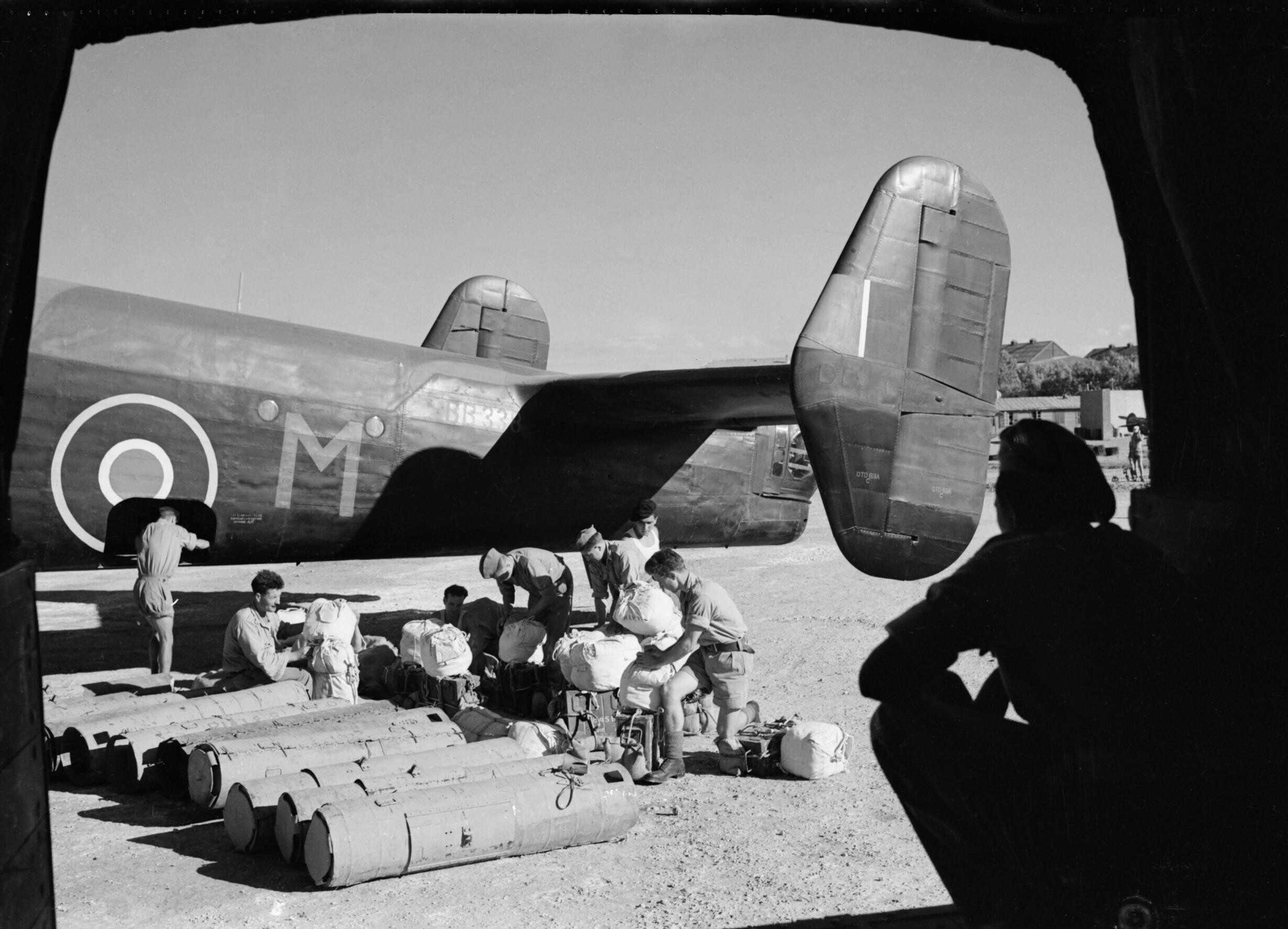
CLE Canisters about to be loaded onto a Handley Page Halifax bomber of 148 Squadron, which will drop them on Yugoslav Partisans. Brindisi, Italy, c. 1944

Initially, the canisters were of wood and metal construction. The Mark I canister weighted around 46 kg (101 lb) empty and 159 kg (351 lb) when filled. It was cylindrical, 1.7 m (5 ft 7 in) long and 40 cm (16 in) in diameter. The Mark 1T canister was similar except it was of metal construction and slightly heavier, weighing 61 kg (134 lb) empty and again 159 kg (351 lb) when filled. The Mark III canister was similar, but slightly longer 1.8 m (5 ft 11 in).

One end of the canister carried a parachute pack. The parachute was deployed by a static line, which opened a pilot parachute, which in turn opened the main canopy. The other end of the canister was fitted with a pan-like structure that cushioned the impact of landing. The canisters' shackle attachment system allowed them to be carried from the bomb-racks of bomber aircraft.

The canisters could be fitted with four battery-powered lights, to make them easier to find when dropped at night. There were also experiments with fitting them with smoke markers.

== Use and deployment ==
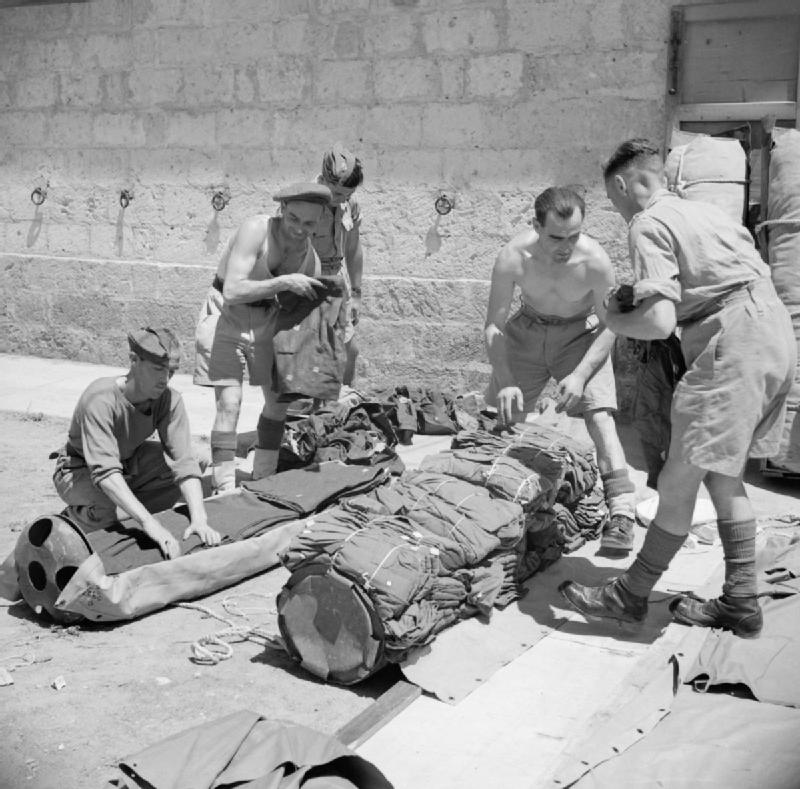
Clothing for anti-German partisans is packed into CLE canisters, Italy April–May 1945

The canisters could contain food, ammunition, weapons or other equipment — the Mark 1 canister could carry 12 rifles and 1000 rounds of ammunition. A cylindrical fuel can was also developed to fit the CLE Canister, with a canister able to accommodate three of the cans. Some loads, such as radios, weren't dropped in CLE Canisters and required special containers to carry and protect them.

Prepacked canisters were allocated code numbers according to their load; a unit requiring resupply simply had to communicate the code and the number of canisters required. The type of load was indicated by the colour of the parachute, so the contents could be identified without opening the container. The colours used were periodically changed to confuse the enemy. During Operation Market Garden, for example, the colours used were red for ammunition, green for rations, white for medical supplies, blue for fuel and yellow for communication equipment. The CLE canister were also used to supply a wheelbarrow device, the Folding Trolley Airborne, known as a "Para Barra", and also Welbikes.

As well as World War II, the canisters saw use in Operation Musketeer - the 1956 Anglo-French invasion of the Suez Canal zone.

== See also ==
- Lindholme Gear
- Storepedo

== Bibliography ==
- Frank Steer (21 October 2000). Arnhem The Fight to Sustain: The Untold Story of the Airborne Logisticians. Pen and Sword. ISBN 978-0-85052-770-4.
