= Toggle rope =

20th-century military equipment

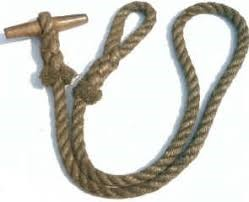
Toggle rope

A toggle rope was part of the standard equipment of British commandos and the Parachute Regiment during World War II. It was 6 feet (1.8 m) long, and had a toggle at one end in a tightly fitting eye splice, with a larger eye at the other end. This enabled them to be fastened together to create an ersatz rope ladder, or to secure around a bundle for hauling, among other uses as well as an ad-hoc truncheon. The ropes were carried around the commandos and paratroopers waists while not in use.

The toggle rope was also used by US Army Rangers and Australia in the Vietnam War as the fibre rope assembly, single leg, polyester fibre, 1in circ. 9ft long Later variants of the nylon rope lacked the toggle and was 10mm x 4m long and was stored in a 1 ft long coil when stashed away. Modern day issued variants are the Platatac toggle rope.

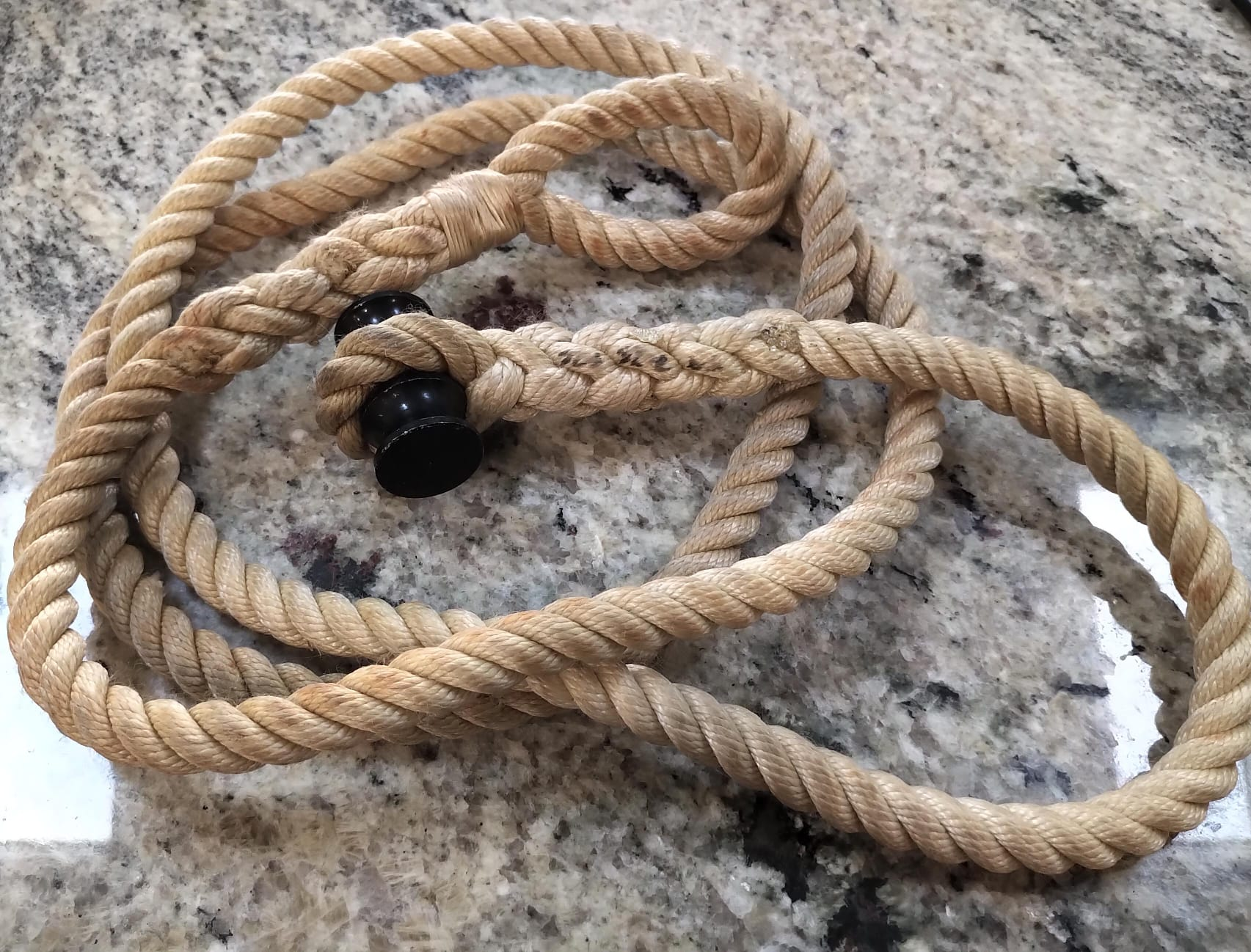
SADF Toggle Rope

The South African Defence Force (SADF) issued a modern version of the toggle rope widely to its soldiers in the 70's and 80's, it was generally referred to by soldiers by its Afrikaans name "tokkel-tou". The toggle was manufactured of anodised aluminium and a spliced nylon rope 190 cm long was used.

== Gallery ==
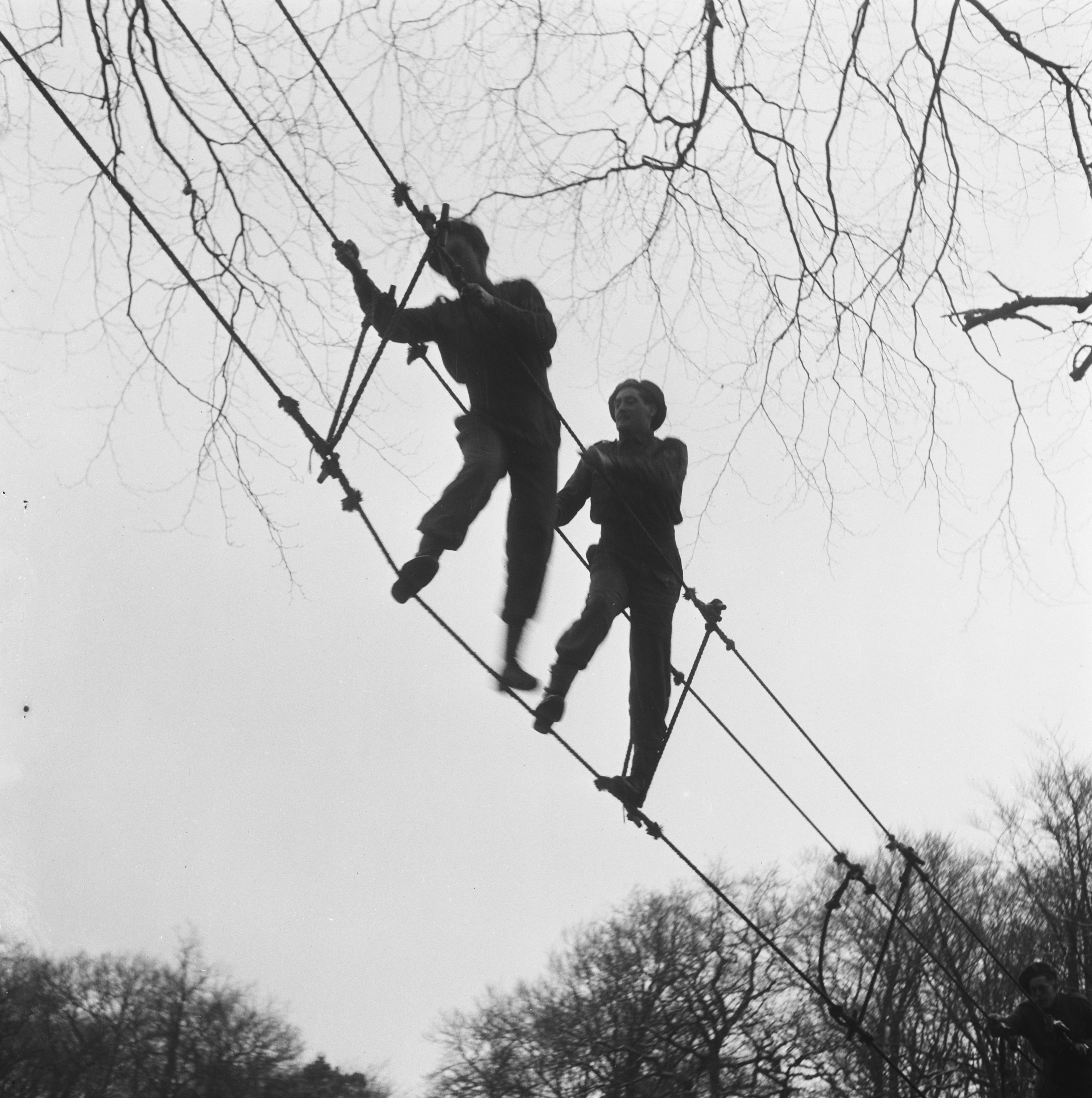
Toggle bridge, showing the linking eyes and toggles.

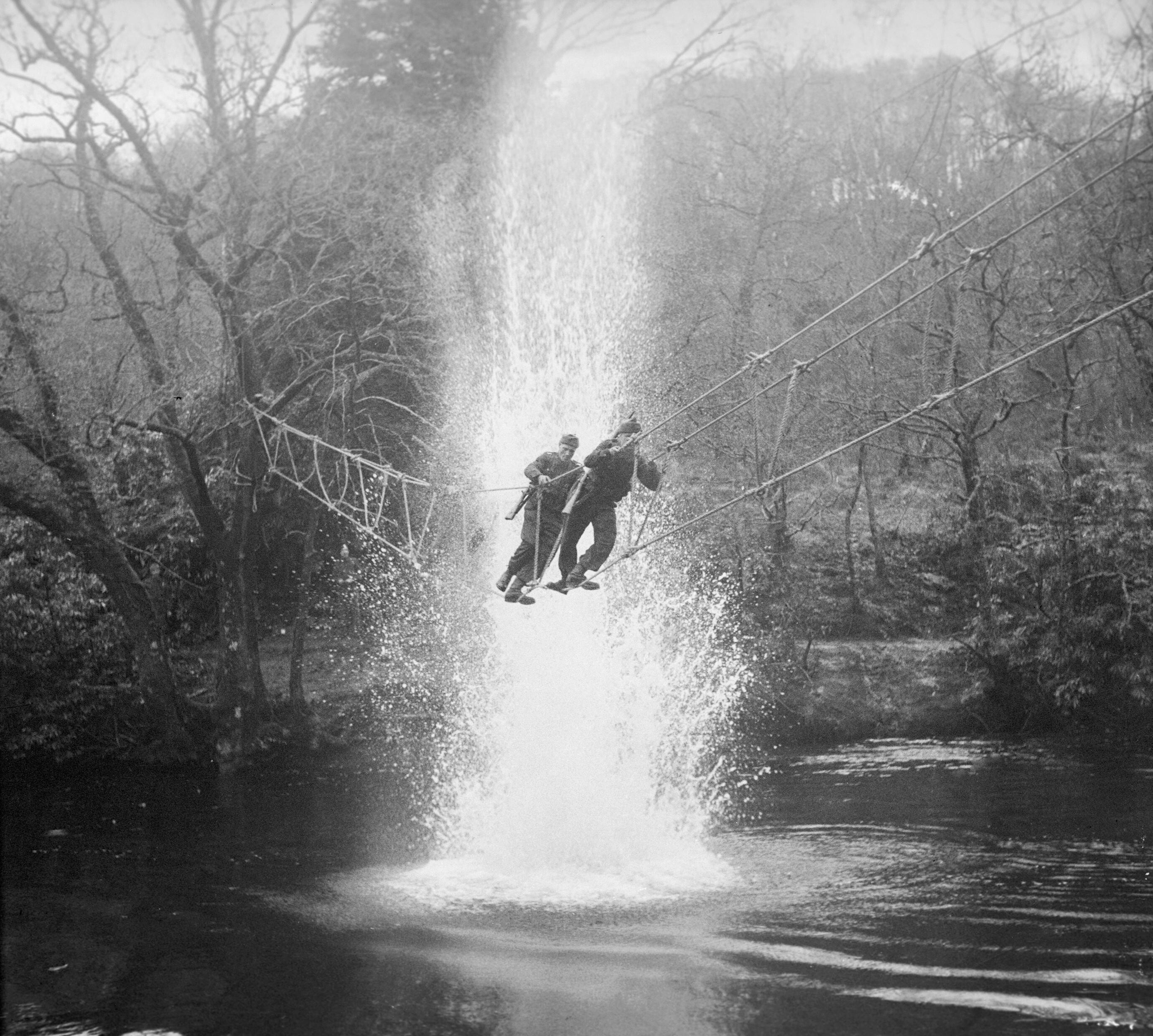
Commandos on a toggle rope bridge.

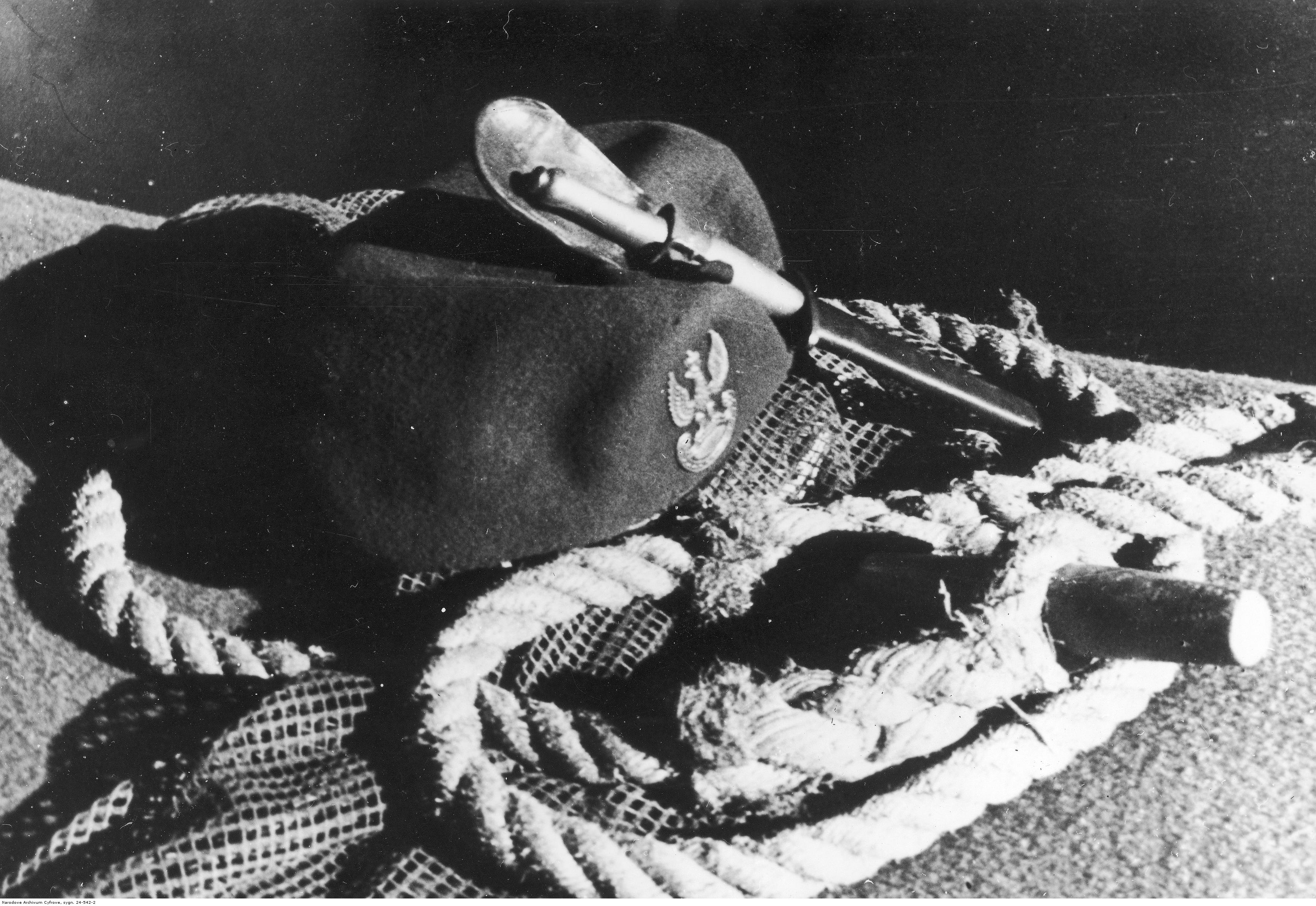
Polish Commando equipment, 1945, including a toggle rope and a Fairbairn–Sykes fighting knife.

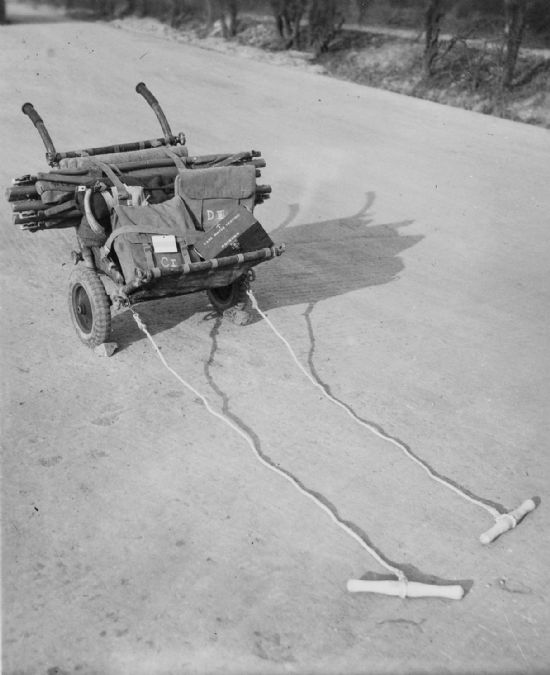
A Para Barra using field medical supplies. Note the toggle ropes.
