= Jeff Nicklin =

Canadian football player and World War II veteran

- Born: December 10, 1914; Winnipeg, Manitoba, Canada
- Died: March 24, 1945 (aged 30); Wesel, Germany
- Burial place: Groesbeek Canadian War Cemetery
- Military career
- Allegiance: Canada
- Branch: Canadian Army
- Service years: 1940–1945
- Rank: Lieutenant Colonel
- Unit: Royal Winnipeg Rifles
- Commands: 1st Canadian Parachute Battalion
- Conflicts: World War II; Operation Overlord; Normandy landings; Battle of the Bulge; Operation Varsity †
- Awards: Officer of the Order of the British Empire

Lieutenant Colonel Jevon Albert "Jeff" Nicklin OBE (December 10, 1914 − March 24, 1945) was a Canadian Army officer and football player. He fought during World War II and was one of the first Canadians to jump on D-Day, 6 June 1944, and led the 1st Canadian Parachute Battalion in the Battle of the Bulge and later when it jumped into German territory in Operation Varsity during the final stages of the war in March 1945. Nicklin was killed in action during the operation.

== Football career ==
The native of Winnipeg was born in 1914, the son of Percy Harold Nicklin and Eva Louise Nicklin. He played Canadian football as a back with the Winnipeg Blue Bombers from 1934 to 1940. In 1935, Winnipeg became the first Western team to capture the Grey Cup. While Nicklin was there, the club advanced to the Grey Cup twice more in 1937 and 1938, before losing in the finals. In 1939, Winnipeg returned to capture the 27th Grey Cup by defeating the Ottawa Rough Riders. Nicklin received Western all-star honours as an end in 1937 and 1938, and as flying wing in 1939.

He also played in the Tea Bowl for the Canadian Army football team against American Army team at White City Stadium on February 13, 1944 in London, England (the Canadians won 16-6, and Nicklin scored the final touchdown).

== Military service ==
Nicklin served in the Canadian Army during the Second World War (1939−1945), and, after enlisting in the Royal Winnipeg Rifles of the Canadian Army in the summer of 1940, he worked his way up through the ranks from private and later was commissioned as an officer. In 1941, he deployed to Europe.

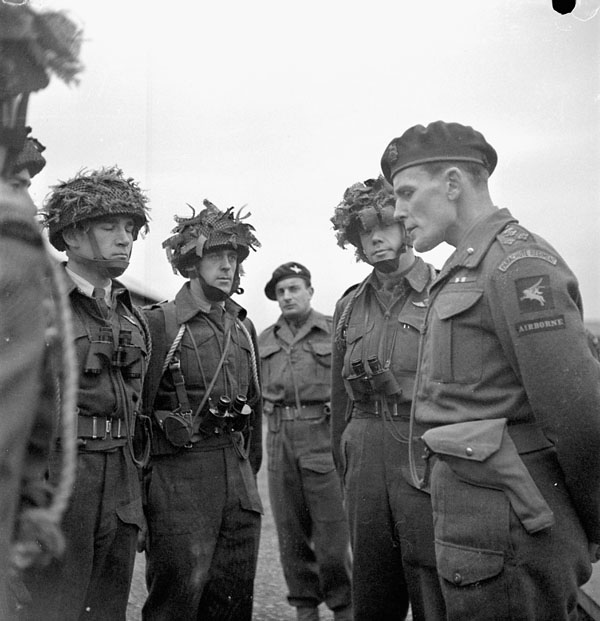
Brigadier Hill (right), commanding the 3rd Parachute Brigade, briefs officers of the 1st Canadian Parachute Battalion at Carter Barracks at Bulford, England, December 1943. To his right is Major Nicklin.

Nicklin received parachute training in the United States at Fort Benning, Georgia, and then returned to Canada to establish the country's first parachute unit at Camp Shilo, Manitoba. He became the Commanding Officer (CO) of the 1st Canadian Parachute Battalion, then serving as part of the 3rd Parachute Brigade of the British 6th Airborne Division, just before November 1, 1944 and was promoted to lieutenant colonel on November 10, 1944. Nicklin was one of the first Canadians to jump on D-Day in June 1944 and later one of the first to jump into Germany.

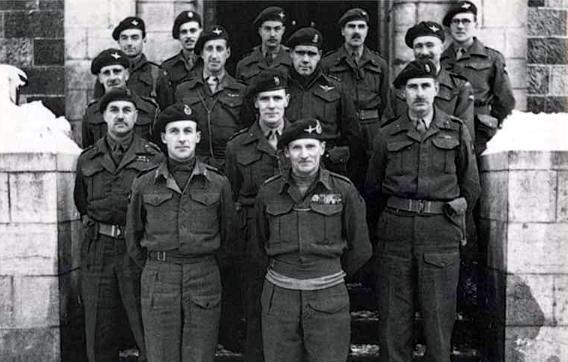
Senior officers of the 6th Airborne Division with Field Marshal Montgomery (front row, centre) in the Ardennes, January 1945. Stood two ranks behind Montgomery is Lieutenant Colonel Nicklin.

On D-Day, June 6, 1944, he landed in the midst of a German position at Varaville. His parachute was ensnared on a rooftop, and he received fire from German soldiers before he cut himself free and took cover. He eventually rejoined his unit, and was later wounded by shrapnel.

He was killed in action on March 24, 1945. During an airborne assault across the Rhine northwest of Wesel as part of Operation Varsity, Nicklin's parachute became tangled in a tall tree, and as he attempted to free himself, he was shot and killed by German soldiers. He is now buried in Groesbeek Canadian War Cemetery. He left a widow, Mary Eileen Nicklin, in Port Credit, Ontario. On July 12, 1945 it was announced that he had been appointed Officer of the Order of the British Empire, "in recognition of gallant and distinguished services in North-West Europe (to be dated the 30th June, 1945)". The original recommendation for the honour describes how he was able to "rectify certain aspects of the Battalion's life which were not satisfactory" and credited him with "the smooth working and unparalleled success which has met the inclusion of a Canadian Battalion in a British Brigade", the recommendation concludes, "throughout the present campaign his example of courageous leadership has been an example to all who have come into contact with him."

== Legacy ==
- The Jeff Nicklin Memorial Trophy for the Canadian Football League West Division's most valuable player is named in his honour. Nicklin was inducted into the Manitoba Sports Hall of Fame in 2004. Sportswriter Vince Leah placed Nicklin atop his list of all-time greatest Winnipeg players in A History of the Blue Bombers.
- A documentary film about Nicklin, Jeff Nicklin: Hero of the Gridiron and the Battlefield, has been produced by the War Amps of Canada.
- Nicklin's story and that of the 1st Canadian Parachute Battalion during Operation Varsity was featured in the episode "Across the Rhine - Paratroopers in Germany" of Season 1 of the documentary series War Story.

== See also ==
- List of gridiron football players who died during their careers
