= Folding Trolley Airborne =

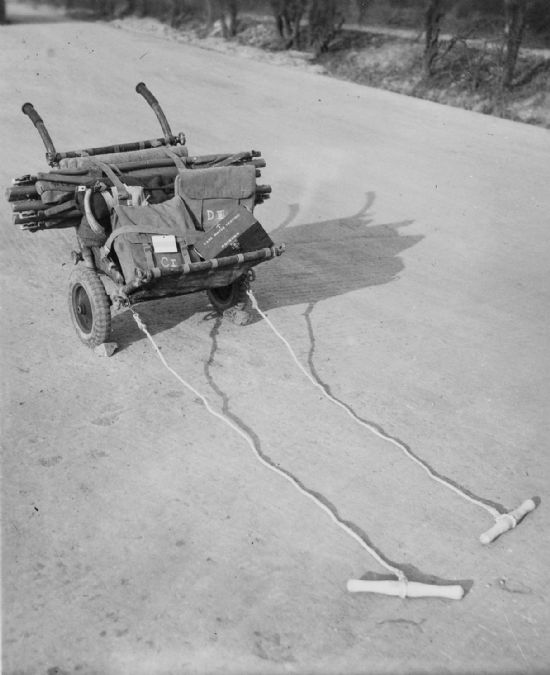
A Para Barra using field medical supplies. Note the toggle ropes.

The Folding Trolley Airborne was a wheelbarrow device used to transport equipment on the battlefield by British Airborne Forces, known as the "Para barra".

== See also ==
- CLE Canister
